= List of acts of the Parliament of the United Kingdom from 1802 =

This is a complete list of acts of the Parliament of the United Kingdom for the year 1802.

Note that the first parliament of the United Kingdom was held in 1801; parliaments between 1707 and 1800 were either parliaments of Great Britain or of Ireland). For acts passed up until 1707, see the list of acts of the Parliament of England and the list of acts of the Parliament of Scotland. For acts passed from 1707 to 1800, see the list of acts of the Parliament of Great Britain. See also the list of acts of the Parliament of Ireland.

For acts of the devolved parliaments and assemblies in the United Kingdom, see the list of acts of the Scottish Parliament, the list of acts of the Northern Ireland Assembly, and the list of acts and measures of Senedd Cymru; see also the list of acts of the Parliament of Northern Ireland.

The number shown after each act's title is its chapter number. Acts passed before 1963 are cited using this number, preceded by the year(s) of the reign during which the relevant parliamentary session was held; thus the Union with Ireland Act 1800 is cited as "39 & 40 Geo. 3 c. 67", meaning the 67th act passed during the session that started in the 39th year of the reign of George III and which finished in the 40th year of that reign. Note that the modern convention is to use Arabic numerals in citations (thus "41 Geo. 3" rather than "41 Geo. III"). Acts of the last session of the Parliament of Great Britain and the first session of the Parliament of the United Kingdom are both cited as "41 Geo. 3". Acts passed from 1963 onwards are simply cited by calendar year and chapter number.

All modern acts have a short title, e.g. "the Local Government Act 2003". Some earlier acts also have a short title given to them by later acts, such as by the Short Titles Act 1896.

== 42 Geo. 3 ==
Continuing the second session of the 1st Parliament of the United Kingdom, which met from 29 October 1801 until 28 June 1802.

This session was also traditionally cited as 42 G. 3.

=== Public general acts ===
Short title	Citation	Royal assent
Long title
Loans or Exchequer Bills Act 1802 (repealed)	42 Geo. 3. c. 17	24 February 1802
An act for raising a further Sum of Money by Loans or Exchequer Bills, for the Service of Great Britain for the Year One thousand eight hundred and two. (Repealed by Statute Law Revision Act 1872 (35 & 36 Vict. c. 63))
Southern Whale Fishery Act 1802 (repealed)	42 Geo. 3. c. 18	24 February 1802
An act for continuing the Premiums allowed to Ships employed in, and for enlarging the Limits of the Southern Whale Fishery. (Repealed by Customs Law Repeal Act 1825 (6 Geo. 4. c. 105))
Westminster Fish Market Act 1802 (repealed)	42 Geo. 3. c. 19	24 February 1802
An act to amend so much of an Act, made in the twenty-ninth Year of the Reign of his late Majesty King George the Second, intituled, (Note: Fish Act 1756 (29 Geo. 2. c. 39)) "An act for explaining, amending, and rendering more effectual an Act made in the twenty second Year of his present Majesty's Reign, (Note: Fish Market, Westminster Act 1748 (22 Geo. 2. c. 49)) intituled, 'An act for making a free Market for the Sale of Fish in the City of Westminster, and for preventing the forestalling and monopolizing of Fish; and for allowing the Sale of Fish under the Dimensions mentioned in a Clause contained in an Act of the first Year of his late Majesty's Reign, in case the same are taken with a Hook,'" as relates to the Sale of Eels. (Repealed by Sea Fisheries Act 1868 (31 & 32 Vict. c. 45))
Duties on Rum, etc. Act 1802 (repealed)	42 Geo. 3. c. 20	19 March 1802
An act for making perpetual so much of an Act, made in the nineteenth Year of the Reign of his present Majesty, (Note: Continuance of Laws Act 1779 (19 Geo. 3. c. 22)) as relates to the allowing a Drawback of the Duties on Rum shipped as Stores to be consumed on board Merchant Ships on their Voyages; and to continue several Laws relating to the permitting the Exportation of Tobacco Pipe Clay from Great Britain to the British Sugar Colonies in the West Indies until the twenty-fourth Day of June One thousand eight hundred and eight; to the giving further Encouragement to the Importation of Naval Stores from the British Colonies in America until the twenty-ninth Day of September One thousand eight hundred and twelve; to the regulating the Payment of the Duties on Cinnamon, Cloves, Nutmegs, and Mace; to the allowing the Importation of certain Fish from Newfoundland and the Coast of Labrador until the twenty fourth Day of June One thousand eight hundred and eight; and to the allowing the Importation and Exportation of Goods from and to India and China, in Ships not of British built, during the Continuance of the exclusive Trade to and from the East Indies, granted to the East India Company by an Act of the thirty-third Year of his present Majesty's Reign. (Note: East India Company Act 1793 (33 Geo. 3. c. 52)) (Repealed by Statute Law Revision Act 1861 (24 & 25 Vict. c. 101))
Loans or Exchequer Bills (No. 2) Act 1802 (repealed)	42 Geo. 3. c. 21	19 March 1802
An act for raising the Sum of one Million by Loans or Exchequer Bills, for the Service of Great Britain for the Year One thousand eight hundred and two. (Repealed by Statute Law Revision Act 1872 (35 & 36 Vict. c. 63))
Greenland Whale Fisheries Act 1802 (repealed)	42 Geo. 3. c. 22	19 March 1802
An act for continuing, until the twenty-fifth Day of December One thousand eight hundred and four, the Bounties granted for the Encouragement of the Greenland Whale Fisheries; and for continuing and amending the Regulations respecting the same. (Repealed by Customs Law Repeal Act 1825 (6 Geo. 4. c. 105))
Indemnity Act 1802 (repealed)	42 Geo. 3. c. 23	19 March 1802
An Act to indemnify such Persons as have omitted to qualify themselves for Offices and Employments; and to indemnify Justices of the Peace, or others, who have omitted to register or deliver in their Qualifications within the Time directed by Law, and for extending the Time limited for those Purposes, until the twenty-fifth Day of December One thousand eight hundred and two; to indemnify Members and Officers, in Cities, Corporations, and Borough Towns, whose Admissions have been omitted to be stamped according to Law, or having been stamped have been lost or mislaid, and for allowing them until the twenty-fifth Day of December One thousand eight hundred and two, to provide Admissions duly stamped; to permit such Persons as have omitted to make and file Affidavits of the Execution of Indentures of Clerks to Attornies and Solicitors, to make and file the same on or before the first Day of Michaelmas Term One thousand eight hundred and two; to allow until the twenty-fourth Day of December One thousand eight hundred and two, Persons who have omitted to pay the Duties on the Indentures and Contracts of Clerks, Apprentices, or Servants, to make Payment of the same; to indemnify such Persons as have neglected to obtain Certificates of Admission as Solicitors or Attornies, Notaries or Proctors, and for extending the Time, limited for that Purpose, until two Months after the passing of this Act; to indemnify Persons who have printed or published Pleadings, and other Proceedings in Courts of Law or Equity, upon which the Name and Place of Abode of the Printer has not been printed; and for indemnifying Deputy Lieutenants and Officers of the Militia, who have neglected to transmit Descriptions of their Qualifications to the Clerks of the Peace, within the Time directed by Law, and for extending the Time, limited for that Purpose, until the first Day of September One thousand eight hundred and two. (Repealed by Promissory Oaths Act 1871 (34 & 35 Vict. c. 48))
Duties on Cinnamon, etc. Act 1802 (repealed)	42 Geo. 3. c. 24	19 March 1802
An act to repeal the Duties on Cinnamon imported by the East India Company, and on Cassia Lignea of all Sorts, and for granting new Duties in lieu thereof; and to repeal the Custom Duties on certain Hides and Skins; and to repeal certain Duties granted by an Act of the last Session of Parliament (Note: Taxation (No. 3) Act 1801 (41 Geo. 3. (U.K.) c. 28)) upon Box Wood imported, and granting new Duties in lieu thereof. (Repealed by Statute Law Revision Act 1861 (24 & 25 Vict. c. 101))
Mutiny Act 1802 (repealed)	42 Geo. 3. c. 25	24 March 1802
An act for punishing Mutiny and Desertion; and for the better Payment of the Army and their Quarters, within the United Kingdom, and the Islands of Jersey, Guernsey, Alderney, Sark, and Man. (Repealed by Statute Law Revision Act 1872 (35 & 36 Vict. c. 63))
Marine Mutiny Act 1802 (repealed)	42 Geo. 3. c. 26	24 March 1802
An act for the Regulation of his Majesty's Marine Forces while on Shore, until the twenty-fifth Day of May One thousand eight hundred and two. (Repealed by Statute Law Revision Act 1872 (35 & 36 Vict. c. 63))
Countervailing Duties Act 1802 (repealed)	42 Geo. 3. c. 27	24 March 1802
An act to empower his Majesty to cause certain countervailing Duties, granted by an Act of the thirty Seventh Year of the Reign of his present Majesty, intituled, "An act for carrying into Execution the Treaty of Amity, Commerce, and Navigation, concluded between his Majesty and the United States of America," (Note: Treaty with United States Act 1797 (37 Geo. 3. c. 97)) to cease, or be suspended until the twenty-fifth Day of March One thousand eight hundred and three, under certain Circumstances. (Repealed by Statute Law Revision Act 1872 (35 & 36 Vict. c. 63))
Transportation Act 1802 (repealed)	42 Geo. 3. c. 28	24 March 1802
An act for continuing, until the twenty-fifth Day of March One thousand eight hundred and five, and from thence to the End of the then next Session of Parliament, and amending several Laws relating to the Transportation of Felons and other Offenders, to temporary Places of Confinement in England and Scotland respectively. (Repealed by Statute Law Revision Act 1872 (35 & 36 Vict. c. 63))
Fort Marlborough in India Act 1802 (repealed)	42 Geo. 3. c. 29	24 March 1802
An act to authorize the East India Company to make their Settlement at Fort Marlborough, in the East Indies, a Factory subordinate to the Presidency of Fort William in Bengal, and to transfer the Servants who, on the Reduction of that Establishment, shall be supernumary, to the Presidency of Fort Saint George. (Repealed by Statute Law Revision Act 1872 (35 & 36 Vict. c. 63))
Proceedings Against Spiritual Persons Act 1802 (repealed)	42 Geo. 3. c. 30	24 March 1802
An act to continue, until the twenty-fifth Day of July One thousand eight hundred and two, an Act, made in the last Session of Parliament, (Note: Pluralities of Livings Act 1801 (41 Geo. 3. (U.K.) c. 102)) intituled, "An act to stay, until the twenty-fifth Day of March One thousand eight hundred and two, Proceedings in Actions under the Statute of King Henry the Eighth, (Note: Clergy Act 1529 (21 Hen. 8. c. 13)) for abridging Spiritual Persons from having Pluralities of Livings, and from taking of Farms." (Repealed by Statute Law Revision Act 1872 (35 & 36 Vict. c. 63))
Duties Continuance Act 1802 (repealed)	42 Geo. 3. c. 31	24 March 1802
An act for continuing, until the twenty-fifth Day of March One thousand eight hundred and three, several Acts of the last Session of Parliament, for continuing and granting Duties to his Majesty in Ireland. (Repealed by Statute Law Revision Act 1872 (35 & 36 Vict. c. 63))
Lairy Embankment (Plymouth) Act 1802 (repealed)	42 Geo. 3. c. 32	24 March 1802
An act to enable his Majesty to grant certain Parcels of Land, situate between Great Prince Rock and the Village of Crab Tree, called Tothill Bay, and Lipson Bay, near to the Borough of Plymouth in the County of Devon, to certain Persons therein named, for the Purpose of embanking and preferring the same from the Sea. (Repealed by Plymouth Corporation Act 1898 (61 & 62 Vict. c. cxxxix))
National Debt Act 1802 (repealed)	42 Geo. 3. c. 33	15 April 1802
An act for raising the Sum of twenty-five Millions by way of Annuities. (Repealed by Statute Law Revision Act 1870 (33 & 34 Vict. c. 69))
Duties on Windows, etc. Act 1802 (repealed)	42 Geo. 3. c. 34	15 April 1802
An act for granting to his Majesty certain additional Duties on Windows or Lights, and on inhabited Houses; and for consolidating the same with the present Duties thereon. (Repealed by Statute Law Revision Act 1861 (24 & 25 Vict. c. 101))
Trade in Grain, etc. Act 1802 (repealed)	42 Geo. 3. c. 35	15 April 1802
An act for regulating, until the fifteenth Day of February One thousand eight hundred and three, the Prices at which Grain, Meal, and Flour, may be exported from Great Britain to Ireland, and from Ireland to Great Britain. (Repealed by Statute Law Revision Act 1872 (35 & 36 Vict. c. 63))
Collection of Revenues (Ireland) Act 1802 (repealed)	42 Geo. 3. c. 36	15 April 1802
An act to continue, until the twenty-ninth Day of September One thousand eight hundred and three, several Acts of the last Session of Parliament for reviving, continuing, and amending several Laws for the better Collection and Security of the Revenues of Ireland. (Repealed by Statute Law Revision Act 1872 (35 & 36 Vict. c. 63))
Duties on Servants, etc. Act 1802 (repealed)	42 Geo. 3. c. 37	30 April 1802
An act for granting to his Majesty certain additional Duties on Servants, Carriages, Horses, Mules, and Dogs; and for consolidating the same with the present Duties thereon. (Repealed by Statute Law Revision Act 1861 (24 & 25 Vict. c. 101))
Duties on Beer, etc. Act 1802 (repealed)	42 Geo. 3. c. 38	30 April 1802
An act for granting to his Majesty additional Duties on Beer and Ale brewed in or imported into Great Britain; on Malt made in Great Britain; on Hops grown in or imported into Great Britain; and on Spirits distilled in Ireland and imported into Great Britain; for repealing certain Allowances to Brewers of Beer and Ale; and for preventing Frauds and Abuses in the Revenue of Excise, on Beer, Ale, and Malt. (Repealed by Statute Law Revision Act 1861 (24 & 25 Vict. c. 101))
Repayment of Certain Loans Act 1802 (repealed)	42 Geo. 3. c. 39	30 April 1802
An act for extending the Time for the Payment of certain Sums of Money, advanced by way of Loan to several Persons connected with and trading to the Islands of Grenada and Saint Vincent. (Repealed by Statute Law Revision Act 1872 (35 & 36 Vict. c. 63))
Restriction on Cash Payments Act 1802 (repealed)	42 Geo. 3. c. 40	30 April 1802
An act to continue, until the first Day of March One thousand eight hundred and three, the Restrictions contained in several Acts of the thirty-seventh (Note: Restriction on Cash Payments Act 1797 (37 Geo. 3. c. 45)) (Note: Restrictions on Cash Payments Act 1797 (37 Geo. 3. c. 91)) and thirty-eighth (Note: Restriction on Cash Payments (No. 2) Act 1797 (38 Geo. 3. c. 1)) Years of the Reign of his present Majesty, on Payment in Cash by the Bank. (Repealed by Statute Law Revision Act 1872 (35 & 36 Vict. c. 63))
Exchequer Bills Act 1802 (repealed)	42 Geo. 3. c. 41	4 May 1802
An act to enable the Lords Commissioners of his Majesty's Treasury of Great Britain to issue Exchequer Bills, on the Credit of such Aids or Supplies as have been or shall be granted by Parliament, for the Service of Great Britain for the Year One thousand eight hundred and two. (Repealed by Statute Law Revision Act 1872 (35 & 36 Vict. c. 63))
Income Tax Repeal, etc. Act 1802 (repealed)	42 Geo. 3. c. 42	4 May 1802
An act for repealing the Duties on Income; for the effectual Collection of Arrears of the said Duties, and accounting for the same; and for charging the Annuities specifically charged thereon, upon the Consolidated Fund of Great Britain. (Repealed by Statute Law Revision Act 1872 (35 & 36 Vict. c. 63))
Duties of Customs and Tonnage Act 1802 (repealed)	42 Geo. 3. c. 43	7 May 1802
An act for granting to his Majesty certain Duties on Goods imported into and exported from Great Britain, and on the Tonnage of Ships and Vessels entering outwards or Inwards in any Port of Great Britain to or from Foreign Parts. (Repealed by Statute Law Revision Act 1861 (24 & 25 Vict. c. 101))
Importation Act 1802 (repealed)	42 Geo. 3. c. 44	7 May 1802
An act for permitting French Wines to be imported into Great Britain in Bottles or Flasks, under certain Restrictions. (Repealed by Customs Law Repeal Act 1825 (6 Geo. 4. c. 105))
Restriction on Cash Payments (Ireland) Act 1802 (repealed)	42 Geo. 3. c. 45	7 May 1802
An act to continue, until three Months after any Restriction imposed by any Act of the present Session of Parliament on the Bank of England from issuing Cash in Payment shall cease, an Act made in the Parliament of Ireland in the thirty-seventh Year of the Reign of his present Majesty, (Note: Restriction on Cash Payments (Ireland) Act 1797 (37 Geo. 3. c. 51 (I))) for confirming and continuing the Restrictions on Payments in Cash by the Bank of Ireland. (Repealed by Statute Law Revision Act 1872 (35 & 36 Vict. c. 63))
Parish Apprentices Act 1802 (repealed)	42 Geo. 3. c. 46	7 May 1802
An act to require Overseers and Guardians of the Poor, to keep a Register of the several Children who shall be bound or assigned by them as Apprentices; and to extend the Provisions of an Act, passed in the twentieth Year of the Reign of his present Majesty, (Note: Poor Apprentices Act 1780 (20 Geo. 3. c. 36)) to the binding of Apprentices by Houses of Industry, or Establishments for the Poor, which have been authorized so to do by subsequent Acts. (Repealed by Poor Law Act 1927 (17 & 18 Geo. 5. c. 14))
Duties on Sugar, etc. Act 1802 (repealed)	42 Geo. 3. c. 47	10 May 1802
An act to continue, until the twentieth Day of May One thousand eight hundred and three, and amend an Act made in the last Session of Parliament (Note: Taxation (No. 8) Act 1801 (41 Geo. 3. (U.K.) c. 44)) relating to certain Duties on Sugar and Coffee exported; for permitting British Plantation Sugar to be warehoused, and for regulating and allowing Drawbacks on Sugar exported. (Repealed by Statute Law Revision Act 1861 (24 & 25 Vict. c. 101))
Annuities to Duke of Sussex etc. Act 1802 (repealed)	42 Geo. 3. c. 48	24 May 1802
An act for enabling his Majesty to settle an Annuity of twelve thousand Pounds on his Royal Highness the Duke of Sussex, and a like Annuity of twelve thousand Pounds on his Royal Highness the Duke of Cambridge, during his Majesty's Pleasure. (Repealed by Statute Law Revision Act 1872 (35 & 36 Vict. c. 63))
Militia Pay (England) Act 1802 (repealed)	42 Geo. 3. c. 49	24 May 1802
An act for defraying the Charge of the Pay of the Militia in England, for the Year One thousand eight hundred and two. (Repealed by Statute Law Revision Act 1872 (35 & 36 Vict. c. 63))
Mutiny (No. 2) Act 1802 (repealed)	42 Geo. 3. c. 50	24 May 1802
An act for continuing an Act, made in this Session of Parliament, intituled, "An act for punishing Mutiny and Desertion; and for the better Payment of the Army and their quarters, within the United Kingdom, and the Islands of Jersey, Guernsey, Alderney, Sark, and Man." (Note: Mutiny Act 1802 (42 Geo. 3. c. 25)) (Repealed by Statute Law Revision Act 1872 (35 & 36 Vict. c. 63))
Marine Mutiny (No. 2) Act 1802 (repealed)	42 Geo. 3. c. 51	24 May 1802
An act for continuing, until the twenty-fifth Day of June One thousand eight hundred and two, an Act made in this Session of Parliament, (Note: Marine Mutiny Act 1802 (42 Geo. 3. c. 26)) for the Regulation of his Majesty's Marine Forces while on Shore. (Repealed by Statute Law Revision Act 1872 (35 & 36 Vict. c. 63))
Post Horse Duties Act 1802 (repealed)	42 Geo. 3. c. 52	24 May 1802
An act for further continuing, until the first Day of February One thousand eight hundred and six, an Act, made in the twenty-seventh Year of the Reign of his present Majesty, (Note: Post Horse Duties Act 1787 (27 Geo. 3. c. 26)) intituled, "An act to enable the Lord High Treasurer, or Commissioners of the Treasury, for the Time being, to let to Farm the Duties granted by an Act, made in the twenty-fifth Year of his present Majesty's Reign, (Note: Duties on Post Horses, etc. Act 1785 (25 Geo. 3. c. 51)) on Horses let to Hire for travelling Post and by Time, to such Persons as should be willing to contract for the same." (Repealed by Statute Law Revision Act 1872 (35 & 36 Vict. c. 63))
Indemnity (Ireland) Act 1802 (repealed)	42 Geo. 3. c. 53	24 May 1802
An act to indemnify Persons who have omitted to qualify themselves for Offices or Employments in Ireland according to Law. (Repealed by Statute Law Revision Act 1872 (35 & 36 Vict. c. 63))
Lotteries Act 1802 (repealed)	42 Geo. 3. c. 54	28 May 1802
An act for granting to his Majesty a certain Sum of Money, to be raised by Lotteries. (Repealed by Statute Law Revision Act 1872 (35 & 36 Vict. c. 63))
Militia Allowances Act 1802 (repealed)	42 Geo. 3. c. 55	28 May 1802
An act for making Allowances in certain Cases to Subaltern Officers of the Militia, during Peace. (Repealed by Statute Law Revision Act 1872 (35 & 36 Vict. c. 63))
Medicines Stamp Act 1802 (repealed)	42 Geo. 3. c. 56	3 June 1802
An act to repeal an Act, passed in the twenty fifth Year of the Reign of his present Majesty, (Note: Medicine Duties Act 1785 (25 Geo. 3. c. 79)) for granting Stamp Duties on certain Medicines, and for charging other Duties in lieu thereof; and for making effectual Provision for the better Collection of the said Duties. (Repealed by Pharmacy and Medicines Act 1941 (4 & 5 Geo. 6. c. 42))
National Debt Commissioners Act 1802 (repealed)	42 Geo. 3. c. 57	3 June 1802
An act to amend so much of an Act, made in the Parliament of Ireland in the thirty-seventh Year of the Reign of his present Majesty, intituled, "An act for vesting a certain Fund in Commissioners at the End of every Quarter of a Year, to be by them applied to the Reduction of the National Debt; and to direct the Application of additional Funds, in case of future Loans to the like Purpose," (Note: National Debt (No. 2) Act (Ireland) 1797 (37 Geo. 3. c. 27 (I))) as relates to the Commissioners for carrying the same into Execution. (Repealed by Statute Law Revision Act 1872 (35 & 36 Vict. c. 63))
National Debt (No. 2) Act 1802 (repealed)	42 Geo. 3. c. 58	3 June 1802
An act for raising a certain Sum of Money by Way of Annuities on Debentures, for the Service of Ireland. (Repealed by Statute Law Revision Act 1870 (33 & 34 Vict. c. 69))
Bounties Act 1802 (repealed)	42 Geo. 3. c. 59	3 June 1802
An act for allowing, until the twentieth Day of May One thousand eight hundred and three, additional Bounties on refined Sugar exported, and discontinuing the Duty thereon granted by an Act of this Session of Parliament. (Repealed by Statute Law Revision Act 1872 (35 & 36 Vict. c. 63))
Drawbacks Act 1802 (repealed)	42 Geo. 3. c. 60	3 June 1802
An act to continue, until the thirtieth Day of May One thousand eight hundred and three, and amend an Act, made in the last Session of Parliament, (Note: Taxation (No. 13) Act 1801 (41 Geo. 3. (U.K.) c. 74)) for regulating and allowing Drawbacks on Sugar exported from Ireland; and for allowing British Plantation Sugar to be warehoused in Ireland; and for granting an additional Drawback on the Exportation of refined Sugar. (Repealed by Statute Law Revision Act 1872 (35 & 36 Vict. c. 63))
Irish Mariners, etc. Act 1802 (repealed)	42 Geo. 3. c. 61	3 June 1802
An act for the further Encouragement of Irish Mariners, and for other Purposes relating thereto. (Repealed by Statute Law Revision Act 1861 (24 & 25 Vict. c. 101))
Oaths at Parliamentary Elections Act 1802 (repealed)	42 Geo. 3. c. 62	3 June 1802
An act for extending the Provisions of an Act, made in the thirty-fourth Year of the Reign of his present Majesty, intituled, An act for directing the Appointment of Commissioners to administer certain Oaths and Declarations, required by Law to be taken and made by Persons offering to vote at the Election of Members to serve in Parliament, to all Oaths now required by Law to be taken by Voters at Elections for Members to serve in Parliament. (Repealed by Statute Law Revision Act 1872 (35 & 36 Vict. c. 63))
Postage Act 1802 (repealed)	42 Geo. 3. c. 63	22 June 1802
An act to authorize the sending and receiving of Letters and Packets, Votes, Proceedings in Parliament, and printed Newspapers by the Post, free from the Duty of Portage, by the Members of the two Houses of Parliament of the United Kingdom, and by certain publick Officers therein named; and for reducing the Postage on such Votes, Proceedings, and Newspapers when sent by any other Persons. (Repealed by Post Office (Repeal of Laws) Act 1837 (7 Will. 4 & 1 Vict. c. 32))
Militia Allowances (No. 2) Act 1802 (repealed)	42 Geo. 3. c. 64	22 June 1802
An act to revive, and further continue until the twenty-fifth Day of March One thousand eight hundred and three, and amend so much of an Act, made in the thirty-ninth and fortieth Years of the Reign of his present Majesty, (Note: Militia Allowances Act 1800 (39 & 40 Geo. 3. c. 44)) as grants certain Allowances to Adjutants and Serjeant-Majors of Militia, disembodied under an Act of the same session of Parliament. (Note: Militia Act 1799 (39 & 40 Geo. 3. c. 1)) (Repealed by Statute Law Revision Act 1872 (35 & 36 Vict. c. 63))
Militia Allowances (No. 3) Act 1802 (repealed)	42 Geo. 3. c. 65	22 June 1802
An act for making Allowances, until the twenty-fifth Day of March One thousand eight hundred and three, in certain Cases, to Subaltern Officers of the Militia of Ireland, during Peace. (Repealed by Statute Law Revision Act 1872 (35 & 36 Vict. c. 63))
Yeomanry and Volunteers Act 1802 (repealed)	42 Geo. 3. c. 66	22 June 1802
An act to enable his Majesty to avail himself of the Offers of certain Yeomanry and Volunteer Corps to continue their Services. (Repealed by Statute Law Revision Act 1861 (24 & 25 Vict. c. 101))
Theft of Turnips, etc. Act 1802 (repealed)	42 Geo. 3. c. 67	22 June 1802
An act to extend the Provisions of an Act, made in the thirteenth Year of the Reign of his present Majesty, (Note: Stealing of Vegetables Act 1772 (13 Geo. 3. c. 32)) intituled, "An act for repealing so much of an Act, made in the twenty-third Year of his late Majesty King George the Second, (Note: Continuance of Laws, etc. Act 1749 (23 Geo. 2. c. 26)) as relates to the preventing the stealing or destroying of Turnips, and for the more effectually preventing the stealing or destroying of Turnips, Potatoes, Cabbages, Parsnips, Pease, and Carrots," to certain other Field Crops, and to Orchards; and for amending the said Act. (Repealed by Statute Law Revision Act 1887 (50 & 51 Vict. c. 59))
Yeomanry (Ireland) Act 1802 (repealed)	42 Geo. 3. c. 68	22 June 1802
An act to enable his Majesty to accept and continue the Services of certain Troops or Companies of Yeomanry in Ireland. (Repealed by Territorial Army and Militia Act 1921 (11 & 12 Geo. 5. c. 37))
Exercise of Trade by Soldiers, etc. Act 1802 (repealed)	42 Geo. 3. c. 69	22 June 1802
An act to enable such Officers, Mariners, and Soldiers as have been in the Land or Sea Service, or in the Marines, or in the Militia, or any Corps of Fencible Men, since the twenty-fourth Year of his present Majesty's Reign, to exercise Trades. (Repealed by Statute Law Revision Act 1872 (35 & 36 Vict. c. 63))
Public Accounts Act 1802 (repealed)	42 Geo. 3. c. 70	22 June 1802
An act for directing certain publick Accounts to be laid annually before Parliament, and for discontinuing certain other Forms of Account now in Use. (Repealed by Statute Law Revision Act 1861 (24 & 25 Vict. c. 101))
National Debt (No. 3) Act 1802 (repealed)	42 Geo. 3. c. 71	22 June 1802
An act to amend and render more effectual two Acts passed in twenty-sixth (Note: National Debt Reduction Act 1786 (26 Geo. 3. c. 31)) and thirty-second (Note: Reduction of National Debt Act 1792 (32 Geo. 3. c. 55)) Years of the Reign of his present Majesty, for the Reduction of the National Debt. (Repealed by Statute Law Revision Act 1861 (24 & 25 Vict. c. 101))
Militia (Stannaries) Act 1802 (repealed)	42 Geo. 3. c. 72	22 June 1802
An Act for repealing an Act, made in the Thirty-eighth Year of the Reign of His Present Majesty, intituled "An Act for raising a Body of Miners in the Counties of Cornwall and Devon, for the Defence of the Kingdom during the present War;" (Note: Regiment of Cornwall and Devon Miners Act 1798 (38 Geo. 3. c. 74)) and the for more effectually raising and regulating a Body of Miners for the Defence of Great Britain. (Repealed by Territorial Army and Militia Act 1921 (11 & 12 Geo. 5. c. 37))
Health and Morals of Apprentices Act 1802 or the Factories Act 1802 or the Factory Act 1802 (repealed)	42 Geo. 3. c. 73	22 June 1802
Act for the preservation of the Health and Morals of Apprentices and others employed in Cotton and other Mills, and Cotton and other Factories. (Repealed by Factory and Workshop Act 1878 (41 & 42 Vict. c. 16))
Loans for Erection of Workhouses Act 1802 (repealed)	42 Geo. 3. c. 74	22 June 1802
An act to amend an Act, made in the twenty-second Year of the Reign of his present Majesty, (Note: Relief of the Poor Act 1782 (22 Geo. 3. c. 83)) for the better Relief and Employment of the Poor, so far as relates to the Payment of the Debts incurred for building any Poor House. (Repealed by Statute Law Revision Act 1872 (35 & 36 Vict. c. 63))
Linen Manufacture (Ireland) Act 1802 (repealed)	42 Geo. 3. c. 75	22 June 1802
An act to amend the Laws for the better Regulation of the Linen Manufacture in Ireland. (Repealed by Statute Law Revision Act 1872 (35 & 36 Vict. c. 63))
Metropolitan Police Magistrates Act 1802 (repealed)	42 Geo. 3. c. 76	22 June 1802
An act for repealing two Acts, made in the thirty-second (Note: Middlesex Justices Act 1792 (32 Geo. 3. c. 53)) and thirty-sixth (Note: Metropolitan Justices Act 1796 (36 Geo. 3. c. 75)) Years of the Reign of his present Majesty, for the more effectual Administration of the Office of a Justice of the Peace, in such Parts of the Counties of Middlesex and Surrey, as lie in and near the Metropolis, and for the more effectual Prevention of Felonies; and for making other Provisions in lieu thereof; and for increasing the Salaries of the Justices at the Thames Police Office, until the first Day of June One thousand eight hundred and seven, and from thence to the End of the then next Session of Parliament. (Repealed by Statute Law Revision Act 1872 (35 & 36 Vict. c. 63))
Pacific Ocean Fisheries Act 1802 (repealed)	42 Geo. 3. c. 77	22 June 1802
An act to permit British-built Ships to carry on the Fisheries in the Pacific Ocean, without Licence from the East India Company, or the South Sea Company. (Repealed by Statute Law Revision Act 1861 (24 & 25 Vict. c. 101))
Hackney Coaches, Metropolis Act 1802 (repealed)	42 Geo. 3. c. 78	22 June 1802
An act to authorize the licensing an additional Number of Hackney Coaches. (Repealed by London Hackney Carriage Act 1831 (1 & 2 Will. 4. c. 22))
British Fisheries, etc. Act 1802 (repealed)	42 Geo. 3. c. 79	22 June 1802
An act to revive, and continue until the fifth Day of April One thousand eight hundred and four, and to amend several Acts, passed in the twenty-seventh, (Note: Fisheries Act 1787 (27 Geo. 3. c. 10)) thirty-fifth, (Note: British Fisheries Act 1795 (35 Geo. 3. c. 56)) and thirty-ninth (Note: British Fisheries Society Act 1799 (39 Geo. 3. c. 100)) Years of his present Majesty's Reign, for the more effectual Encouragement of the British Fisheries; and to continue, until the fourteenth Day of June One thousand eight hundred and three, and from thence to the End of the then next Session of Parliament, so much of an Act of the sixth Year of the Reign of his present Majesty, (Note: Importation, etc. Act 1766 (6 Geo. 3. c. 28)) as relates to the prohibiting the Importation of foreign-wrought Silks and Velvets. (Repealed by Sea Fisheries Act 1868 (31 & 32 Vict. c. 45))
Goods in Neutral Ships Act 1802 (repealed)	42 Geo. 3. c. 80	22 June 1802
An act for repealing several Acts, made in the thirty-fifth, (Note: Importation Act 1795 (35 Geo. 3. c. 15)) (Note: Shipping Act 1795 (35 Geo. 3. c. 80)) thirty-sixth, (Note: Merchandise in Neutral Ships Act 1796 (36 Geo. 3. c. 76)) and thirty-ninth and fortieth (Note: Neutral Ships (No. 3) Act 1800 (39 & 40 Geo. 3. c. 65)) Years of the Reign of his present Majesty, relating to the Admission of certain Articles of Merchandize in Neutral Ships, and to the issuing of Orders in Council for that Purpose, and for making other Provisions in lieu thereof, to continue until the first Day of January One thousand eight hundred and four. (Repealed by Statute Law Revision Act 1872 (35 & 36 Vict. c. 63))
Post Office Act 1802 (repealed)	42 Geo. 3. c. 81	22 June 1802
An act for amending so much of an Act, passed in the seventh Year of the Reign of his present Majesty, (Note: Post Office Offences and Isle of Man Postage Act 1767 (7 Geo. 3. c. 50)) as relates to the secreting, embezzling, or destroying any Letter or Packet sent by the Post; and for the better Protection of such Letters and Packets; and for more effectually preventing such Letters and Packets being sent otherwise than by the Post. (Repealed by Post Office (Repeal of Laws) Act 1837 (7 Will. 4 & 1 Vict. c. 32))
Smuggling Act 1802 (repealed)	42 Geo. 3. c. 82	22 June 1802
An act to alter, amend, and render more effectual an Act, made in the twenty-fourth Year of the Reign of his present Majesty, (Note: Smuggling Act 1784 (24 Geo. 3. Sess. 2. c. 47)) for the more effectual Prevention of Smuggling in Great Britain. (Repealed by Customs Law Repeal Act 1825 (6 Geo. 4. c. 105))
Duties, etc., on Coffee, etc. Act 1802 (repealed)	42 Geo. 3. c. 83	22 June 1802
An act to continue, until the twenty-ninth Day of September One thousand eight hundred and three, an Act, made in the Parliament of Ireland in the thirty-seventh Year of the Reign of his present Majesty, (Note: Coffee Act 1797 (37 Geo. 3. c. 52 (I))) for regulating the Import, Export, and Sale of Coffee, and securing the Duties payable thereon; and also for securing the Duties payable on Licences to Persons in Ireland, not being Maltsters or Makers of Malt, selling Malt by Commission or otherwise. (Repealed by Statute Law Revision Act 1872 (35 & 36 Vict. c. 63))
Controverted Elections Act 1802 (repealed)	42 Geo. 3. c. 84	22 June 1802
An act for the further Regulation of the Trials of controverted Elections, or Returns of Members to serve in, and for expediting the Proceedings relating thereto. (Repealed by Controverted Elections Act 1828 (9 Geo. 4. c. 22))
Criminal Jurisdiction Act 1802	42 Geo. 3. c. 85	22 June 1802
An Act for the trying and punishing in Great Britain Persons holding publick Employments, for Offences committed abroad; and for extending the Provisions of an Act passed in the Twenty-first Year of the Reign of King James (Note: Public Officers Protection Act 1623 (21 Jas. 1. c. 12)) made for the Ease of Justices and others in pleading in Suits brought against them, to all Persons, either in or out of this Kingdom, authorized to commit to safe Custody.
Pluralities of Living, etc. Act 1802 (repealed)	42 Geo. 3. c. 86	22 June 1802
An act to continue, until the eighth Day of April One thousand eight hundred and three, an Act passed in the last Session of Parliament for staying Proceedings in Actions under the Statute of King Henry the Eighth, for abridging Spiritual Persons from having Pluralities of Livings, and of taking of Ferms; and also to stay Proceedings in Action, under an Act of the thirteenth Year of Queen Elizabeth, (Note: Benefices Act 1571 (13 Eliz. 1. c. 20)) touching Leases of Benefices, and other Ecclesiastical Livings, with Cure. (Repealed by Statute Law Revision Act 1872 (35 & 36 Vict. c. 63))
Parliament House, Dublin Act 1802 or the Parliament House Act 1802	42 Geo. 3. c. 87	22 June 1802
An Act to enable the Lord High Treasurer, or Commissioners of his Majesty’s Treasury of Ireland for the Time being, to sell, lease, convey, or dispose of the Parliament House in the City of Dublin, and all the Premises and Appurtenances thereunto belonging, to the Governor and Company of the Bank of Ireland.
Mutiny (No. 3) Act 1802 (repealed)	42 Geo. 3. c. 88	22 June 1802
An act for punishing Mutiny and Desertion; and for the better Payment of the Army and their Quarters. (Repealed by Statute Law Revision Act 1872 (35 & 36 Vict. c. 63))
Lands for Ordnance Services, Woolwich Act 1802	42 Geo. 3. c. 89	22 June 1802
An act for vesting certain Lands and Hereditaments in Trustees, for promoting the Service of his Majesty's Ordnance at Woolwich.
Militia Act 1802 (repealed)	42 Geo. 3. c. 90	26 June 1802
An Act for amending the Laws relating to the Militia in England, and for augmenting the Militia. (Repealed by Reserve Forces Act 1980 (c. 9))
Militia (Scotland) Act 1802 (repealed)	42 Geo. 3. c. 91	26 June 1802
An Act to raise and establish a Militia Force in Scotland. (Repealed by Reserve Forces Act 1980 (c. 9))
Aliens Act 1802 (repealed)	42 Geo. 3. c. 92	26 June 1802
An act for repealing several Acts for establishing Regulations respecting Aliens arriving in this Kingdom, or reliant therein, in certain Cases; and for substituting other Provisions in lieu thereof. (Repealed by Statute Law Revision Act 1872 (35 & 36 Vict. c. 63))
Excise Act 1802 (repealed)	42 Geo. 3. c. 93	26 June 1802
An act for exempting from the Auction Duty Estates and Effects bought in for the Owner, and Goods imported in any British Ship from any British Colony in America, or from any Part of the United States; for better collecting and securing the Duties of Excise on Wine, Home-made Spirits, Starch, Auctioneers, Rum shipped as Stores, and on Goods or Merchandize chargeable with Duties of Excise; for granting a further Allowance of Salt in the curing and preserving of Pilchards and Scads; and for allowing certain Draining Tiles to be made free of Duty. (Repealed by Statute Law Revision Act 1861 (24 & 25 Vict. c. 101))
Paper Duties Act 1802 (repealed)	42 Geo. 3. c. 94	26 June 1802
An act for repealing certain Duties on Paper, Pasteboards, Millboards, Scaleboards, and Glazed Paper, imported into or made in Great Britain; and for granting other Duties in lieu thereof. (Repealed by Duties on Paper Act 1839 (2 & 3 Vict. c. 23))
Customs Act 1802 (repealed)	42 Geo. 3. c. 95	26 June 1802
An act for repealing the Duties, granted by an Act made in this Session of Parliament, (Note: Duties of Customs and Tonnage Act 1802 (42 Geo. 3. c. 43)) on Spermaceti Oil, Blubber, Train Oil, Fish Oil, or Oil of Seals, and granting other Duties in lieu thereof; for repealing the Duties, granted by the said Act, on Linen Yarn made of Flax, and on Goods, Wares, or Merchandize imported by the East India Company, and exported from the Warehouse in which the same shall have been secured; for exempting Stone, the Produce of Guernsey, Jersey, Alderney, Sark, or Man, from Duty; and for permitting Merchandize, the Produce of any of the Colonies ceded to the French and Batavian Republicks, to be imported for three Years from the passing of this Act, upon Payment of certain Duties. (Repealed by Customs Law Repeal Act 1825 (6 Geo. 4. c. 105))
Excise Act (No. 2) 1802 (repealed)	42 Geo. 3. c. 96	26 June 1802
An act to authorize the Commissioners of Excise to order the Restoration of Exciseable Goods seized or detained by Officers of Excise. (Repealed by Statute Law Revision Act 1872 (35 & 36 Vict. c. 63))
Use of Clarke's Hydrometer Act 1802 (repealed)	42 Geo. 3. c. 97	26 June 1802
An act to authorize the Lord High Treasurer or Commissioners of the Treasury in Great Britain, and the Lord High Treasurer or Commissioners of the Treasury in Ireland, to order the Use of the Hydrometers now employed in the Management of the Revenues, to be discontinued; and other Instruments to be used instead thereof. (Repealed by Spirits (Strength Ascertainment) Act 1818 (58 Geo. 3. c. 28) and Customs Law Repeal Act 1825 (6 Geo. 4. c. 105))
Isle of Man Trade Act 1802 (repealed)	42 Geo. 3. c. 98	26 June 1802
An act to continue, until the fifth Day of July One thousand eight hundred and three, two Acts, made in the thirty-eighth Year of the Reign of his present Majesty, (Note: Isle of Man Trade Act 1798 (38 Geo. 3. c. 63)) and in the last Session of Parliament, (Note: Isle of Man Trade Act 1801 (41 Geo. 3. (U.K.) c. 54)) for the further Encouragement of the Trade and Manufactures of the Isle of Man; and for improving the Revenue thereof. (Repealed by Statute Law Revision Act 1872 (35 & 36 Vict. c. 63))
Stamps Act 1802 (repealed)	42 Geo. 3. c. 99	26 June 1802
An act for allowing the stamping certain Deeds until the thirty-first Day of December One thousand eight hundred and two; for amending an Act, passed in the thirty-sixth Year of the Reign of his present Majesty, (Note: Legacy Duty Act 1796 (36 Geo. 3. c. 52)) relating to Duties on Legacies and Shares of Personal Estates; for exempting certain Legacies from the Payment of Duty; for reducing the Allowances on present Payment of Stamp Duties; and for reducing certain Stamp Duties on Policies for Sea Insurances. (Repealed by Inland Revenue Repeal Act 1870 (33 & 34 Vict. c. 99))
Duties on Horses, etc. Act 1802 (repealed)	42 Geo. 3. c. 100	26 June 1802
An act for enlarging the Time for which Horses may be let to Hire without being subject to any annual Duty; for explaining and amending several Acts relating to the Duties on Horses, Servants, and Carriages; and for authorizing the Allowance in the Accounts of the Receivers General of the several Sums advanced by them, in pursuance of the Acts for raising a Provisional Force of Cavalry, and not reimbursed to them by Assessment. (Repealed by Statute Law Revision Act 1872 (35 & 36 Vict. c. 63))
Postage (No. 2) Act 1802 (repealed)	42 Geo. 3. c. 101	26 June 1802
An act for repealing the Rates and Duties of Postage upon Letters to and from France and the Batavian Republic from and to London, and for granting other Rates and Duties in lieu thereof; and for exempting from the Duty of Tonnage the Ships and Vessels to be employed in conveying the Mails of Letters from France to the United Kingdom of Great Britain and Ireland. (Repealed by Post Office (Repeal of Laws) Act 1837 (7 Will. 4 & 1 Vict. c. 32))
Tortola Trade Act 1802 (repealed)	42 Geo. 3. c. 102	26 June 1802
An act for enabling his Majesty to permit the Importation and Exportation of certain Goods and Commodities into and from the Port of Road Harbour in the Island of Tortola, until the first Day of July One thousand eight hundred and three, and from thence until six Weeks after the Commencement of the then next Session of Parliament. (Repealed by Statute Law Revision Act 1872 (35 & 36 Vict. c. 63))
Repeal, etc., of Certain Duties Act 1802 (repealed)	42 Geo. 3. c. 103	26 June 1802
An act to repeal the additional Duty of six Pounds per Centum on the Duties payable on the Importation into Ireland of certain Goods imported by Retailers or Consumers; and for repealing and reducing certain Duties on Policies of Insurance and Sea Insurances in Ireland. (Repealed by Statute Law Revision Act 1861 (24 & 25 Vict. c. 101))
Lottery Regulations Act 1802 (repealed)	42 Geo. 3. c. 104	26 June 1802
An act to require Persons licensed to keep Lottery Offices in Ireland, to divide into Shares a certain Number of whole Lottery Tickets; and for empowering the Lords Commissioners of his Majesty's Treasury of Great Britain to remit to the Exchequer of Ireland a certain Sum of Money out of the Contributions for Lotteries. (Repealed by Statute Law Revision Act 1872 (35 & 36 Vict. c. 63))
Lord Chancellor of Ireland Act 1802 (repealed)	42 Geo. 3. c. 105	26 June 1802
An act for providing a proper Salary for the Office of the Chancellor or Keeper of the Great Seal of Ireland. (Repealed by Statute Law Revision Act 1872 (35 & 36 Vict. c. 63))
Controverted Elections (No. 2) Act 1802 (repealed)	42 Geo. 3. c. 106	26 June 1802
An act for regulating the Trial of Controverted Elections or Returns of Members to serve in the United Parliament for Ireland. (Repealed by Statute Law Revision Act 1872 (35 & 36 Vict. c. 63))
Deer Stealing (England) Act 1802 (repealed)	42 Geo. 3. c. 107	26 June 1802
An act more effectually to prevent the dealing of Deer. (Repealed by Criminal Statutes Repeal Act 1827 (7 & 8 Geo. 4. c. 27) and for India by Criminal Law (India) Act 1828 (9 Geo. 4. c. 74))
Quartering of Soldiers Act 1802 (repealed)	42 Geo. 3. c. 108	26 June 1802
An act for increasing the Rates of Subsistence to be paid to Innkeepers and others on quartering Soldiers. (Repealed by Statute Law Revision Act 1872 (35 & 36 Vict. c. 63))
Militia (Ireland) (No. 1) Act 1802 (repealed)	42 Geo. 3. c. 109	26 June 1802
An act for authorizing and rendering valid the Discharge of certain Militia Men in Ireland; and for giving Indemnity to the several Counties and Places in Ireland, which may incur any Expence in consequence of the Discharge of certain Militia Men. (Repealed by Militia (Ireland) Act 1809 (49 Geo. 3. c. 120))
Loans or Exchequer Bills (No. 3) Act 1802 (repealed)	42 Geo. 3. c. 110	26 June 1802
An act for raising the Sum of five Millions by Loans or Exchequer Bills, for the Service of Great Britain for the Year One thousand eight hundred and three. (Repealed by Statute Law Revision Act 1872 (35 & 36 Vict. c. 63))
Loans or Exchequer Bills (No. 4) Act 1802 (repealed)	42 Geo. 3. c. 111	26 June 1802
An act for raising the Sum of one million five hundred thousand Pounds, by Loans or Exchequer Bills, for the Service of Great Britain for the Year One thousand eight hundred and three. (Repealed by Statute Law Revision Act 1872 (35 & 36 Vict. c. 63))
National Debt (No. 4) Act 1802 (repealed)	42 Geo. 3. c. 112	26 June 1802
An act for granting to his Majesty the Sum of two hundred thousand Pounds, to be issued and paid to the Governor and Company of the Bank of England, to be by them placed to the Account of the Commissioners for the Reduction of the National Debt of Great Britain. (Repealed by Statute Law Revision Act 1861 (24 & 25 Vict. c. 101))
Annuity to Lord Hutchinson, etc. Act 1802 (repealed)	42 Geo. 3. c. 113	26 June 1802
An Act for settling and securing a certain Annuity on Lord Hutchinson, Baron Hutchinson of Alexandria, and of Knocklofty, in the County of Tipperary, and the Two next Persons to whom the Title of Baron Hutchinson shall descend, in consideration of his eminent Services. (Repealed by Statute Law Revision Act 1872 (35 & 36 Vict. c. 63))
Southern Whale Fishery (No. 2) Act 1802 (repealed)	42 Geo. 3. c. 114	26 June 1802
An act for extending the Provisions of two Acts of the thirty-fifth (Note: Southern Whale Fisheries Act 1795 (35 Geo. 3. c. 92)) and thirty-eighth (Note: Southern Whale Fisheries Act 1798 (38 Geo. 3. c. 57)) Years of his present Majesty, so far as they relate to the Encouragement of Persons coming to Milford Haven for the Purpose of carrying on the Southern Whale Fishery. (Repealed by Statute Law Revision Act 1872 (35 & 36 Vict. c. 63))
Marine Mutiny (No. 3) Act 1802 (repealed)	42 Geo. 3. c. 115	26 June 1802
An act for the Regulation of his Majesty's Royal Marine Forces while on Shore. (Repealed by Statute Law Revision Act 1872 (35 & 36 Vict. c. 63))
Land Tax Redemption Act 1802 (repealed)	42 Geo. 3. c. 116	26 June 1802
An act for consolidating the Provisions of the several Acts passed for the Redemption and Sale of the Land Tax, into one Act, and for making further Provision for the Redemption and Sale thereof; and for removing Doubts respecting the Right of Persons claiming to vote at Elections for Knights of the Shire and other Members to serve in Parliament, in respect of Messuages, Lands, or Tenements, the Land Tax upon which shall have been redeemed or purchased. (Repealed by Statute Law (Repeals) Act 1989 (c. 43))
Import and Export Duties Act 1802 (repealed)	42 Geo. 3. c. 117	28 June 1802
An act for granting to his Majesty, certain additional Duties on Goods imported into and exported from Ireland. (Repealed by Statute Law Revision Act 1861 (24 & 25 Vict. c. 101))
Militia (Ireland) (No. 2) Act 1802 (repealed)	42 Geo. 3. c. 118	28 June 1802
An act for defraying the Charge of the Pay of the Militia of Ireland, until the twenty-fifth Day of March One thousand eight hundred and three; and for holding Courts Martial on Serjeant Majors, Serjeants, Corporals, and Drummers, for Offences committed during the Time such Militia shall not be embodied. (Repealed by Statute Law Revision Act 1872 (35 & 36 Vict. c. 63))
Gaming Act 1802 (repealed)	42 Geo. 3. c. 119	28 June 1802
An act to suppress certain Games and Lotteries not authorized by Law. (Repealed for England and Wales and Scotland by Betting and Lotteries Act 1934 (24 & 25 Geo. 5. c. 58) and for Northern Ireland by Betting and Lotteries Act (Northern Ireland) 1957 (c. 19 (N.I)))
Appropriation Act 1802 (repealed)	42 Geo. 3. c. 120	28 June 1802
An act for granting to his Majesty certain Sums of Money out of the respective Consolidated Funds of Great Britain and Ireland; for applying certain Monies therein mentioned, for the Service of the Year One thousand eight hundred and two; and for further appropriating the Supplies granted in this Session of Parliament. (Repealed by Statute Law Revision Act 1872 (35 & 36 Vict. c. 63))

=== Local acts ===
Short title	Citation	Royal assent
Long title
Truro Roads and Steppings Bridge Act 1802 (repealed)	42 Geo. 3. c. iv	24 February 1802
An Act for continuing the Term and altering and enlarging the Powers of Two Acts; the One, passed in the Thirteenth Year of the Reign of His present Majesty, for more effectually amending several Roads leading from and near the Borough of Truro, in the County of Cornwall, and for building and keeping in Repair a Bridge over the River at a place called the Steppings, in or near the said Borough; (Note: Truro Roads Act 1773 (13 Geo. 3. c. 112)) and the other, passed in the Twenty-second Year of the Reign of His present Majesty, for extending the Provisions of the said former Act to the several other Roads therein described. (Note: Truro Roads Act 1782 (22 Geo. 3. c. 89)) (Repealed by Truro Roads Act 1828 (9 Geo. 4. c. iii))
Road from Canterbury to Ramsgate Act 1802	42 Geo. 3. c. v	19 March 1802
An Act for repairing, altering, widening and improving the Road leading from the City of Canterbury to the Town of Ramsgate, in the Isle of Thanet, in the County of Kent; and for suspending and varying, for a limited Time, so much of an Act, passed in the Twenty seventh Year of the Reign of His present Majesty, (Note: Canterbury (Streets) Act 1787 (27 Geo. 3. c. 14)) as relates to the Toll Gate, and to the Tolls now payable by virtue of the said Act, on the Road leading from the said City of Canterbury to the Isle of Thanet.
Road from Canterbury to Sandwich Act 1802	42 Geo. 3. c. vi	19 March 1802
An Act for repairing, altering, widening and improving the Road leading from the City of Canterbury to the Town and Port of Sandwich, in the County of Kent.
Road from Chesterfield to Matlock Bridge Act 1802 (repealed)	42 Geo. 3. c. vii	19 March 1802
An Act for continuing the Term, and altering and enlarging the Powers of Two Acts, passed in the Thirty third Year of the Reign of His late Majesty King George the Second, (Note: Derbyshire Roads Act 1759 (33 Geo. 2. c. 39)) and the Twenty first Year of the Reign of His present Majesty, (Note: Derbyshire Roads Act 1781 (21 Geo. 3. c. 81)) for repairing and widening the Road leading from the Turnpike Road near the West End of the Town of Chesterfield to Matlock Bridge, and also the Road leading out of the said Road over Darley Bridge to Cross Green, and also the Road leading out of the said last mentioned Road to the Turnpike Road near Rowesley Bridge; all in the County of Derby. (Repealed by Roads from Chesterfield to Matlock Bridge Act 1823 (4 Geo. 4. c. xxviii))
Woodbridge and Eye Road Act 1802 (repealed)	42 Geo. 3. c. viii	19 March 1802
An Act for repairing, widening, improving and keeping in Repair, the Road leading from the Shire Hall in the Town and Port of Woodbridge, to the Broad Street in the Town and Borough of Eye, in the County of Suffolk. (Repealed by Statute Law (Repeals) Act 2008 (c. 12))
Road from Union Point to Langney Bridge Act 1802 (repealed)	42 Geo. 3. c. ix	19 March 1802
An Act for continuing the Term, and altering and enlarging the Powers of an Act, passed in the Seventeenth Year of the Reign of His present Majesty, (Note: Sussex Roads (No. 3) Act 1777 (17 Geo. 3. c. 97)) intituled "An Act for repealing an Act, made in the Twenty seventh Year of His late Majesty King George the Second, (Note: Sussex Roads Act 1754 (27 Geo. 2. c. 24)) for amending, widening and keeping in Repair, the Road leading from Union Point, near the Town of Uckfield, in the County of Sussex, to Langney Bridge, in the Parish of Westham, in the said County, and for more effectually repairing the said Road; and also for amending, widening and keeping in Repair the Road from the Side Gate on the Horse Bridge Turnpike Road, in the Parish of Hellingly, to the Turnpike Road leading from Cross-in-Hand to Burwash in the said County." (Repealed by Uckfield and Eastbourne, and Horsebridge and Cross in Hand Roads Act 1823 (4 Geo. 4. c. xii))
Road from Falmouth Act 1802 (repealed)	42 Geo. 3. c. x	19 March 1802
An Act for continuing d the Term, and altering and enlarging the Powers of Two Acts, passed in the First (Note: Falmouth and Marazion Road Act 1760 (1 Geo. 3. c. 32)) and Twenty first (Note: Falmouth and Marazion Road Act 1781 (21 Geo. 3. c. 78)) Years of the Reign of His present Majesty, for amending and widening the Road leading from the Town of Falmouth, in the County of Cornwall, through the Towns of Penryn, Helstone and Marazion, and from thence to and over Marazion River and Bridge, and Two hundred Feet to the Westward of the said River and Bridge. (Repealed by Falmouth and Marazion Road Act 1823 (4 Geo. 4. c. lxxviii))
Barkeswell Inclosure Act 1802	42 Geo. 3. c. xi	19 March 1802
An Act for dividing allotting and inclosing the Commons and Wastes, within the Manor and Parish of Barkeswell, in the County of Warwick.
Wilmslow and Church Lawton Road Act 1802 (repealed)	42 Geo. 3. c. xii	24 March 1802
An Act for continuing the Term, and altering and enlarging the Powers of an Act, passed in the Twenty first Year of the Reign of His present Majesty, (Note: Cheshire Roads Act 1781 (21 Geo. 3. c. 82)) for repairing and widening the Road from Wilmslow Bridge (Note: Wilmslow Bridge over the River Bollin, on the B5166 Manchester Road, Wilmslow, Cheshire. The current bridge dates from 1834. 53°19′49″N 2°13′41″W) in Wilmslow, in the County of Chester, through Nether Alderley (Note: Congleton Road, through Nether Alderley, Cheshire. 53°16′56″N 2°14′10″W) and the Town of Congleton, (Note: Congleton, Cheshire.) to or near the Red Bull (Note: The Red Bull Public House, south of the Trent and Mersey Canal on the A34 Congleton Road South, Church Lawton, Cheshire. 53°05′31″N 2°15′30″W) in Church Lawton, in the said County. (Repealed by Wilmslow Bridge and Church Lawton Road Act 1824 (5 Geo. 4. c. lxxxvii))
Shoreditch Improvement Act 1802 (repealed)	42 Geo. 3. c. xiii	24 March 1802
An Act to enlarge the Powers and explain and amend an Act, made in the Twenty second Year of the Reign of His late Majesty King George the Second, intituled "An Act for the better repairing the Highways, and cleansing the Streets, within the Parish of Saint Leonard, Shoreditch, in the County of Middlesex; and for better enlightening the open Places, Streets, Lanes, Passages and Courts there, and regulating the Nightly Watch and Bedels within the said Parish;" (Note: Shoreditch Lighting and Watching Act 1748 (22 Geo. 2. c. 50)) and for paving, repairing and regulating certain Footways, Squares, Streets, Lanes and other publick Passages and Places in the said Parish; and for removing Nuisances, Obstructions and Annoyances therein. (Repealed by London Government (Borough of Shoreditch) Order in Council 1901 (SR&O 1901/221))
Road from Finford Bridge to Banbury Act 1802 (repealed)	42 Geo. 3. c. xiv	24 March 1802
An Act for continuing the Term, and altering and enlarging the Powers of so much of Two Acts, passed in the Twenty eighth Year of the Reign of His late Majesty King George the Second, (Note: Warwick and Oxford Roads Act 1755 (28 Geo. 2. c. 46)) and the Twentieth Year of the Reign of His present Majesty, (Note: Warwick and Oxford Roads Act 1780 (20 Geo. 3. c. 69)) for repairing and widening the several Roads therein mentioned, as relates to the Road leading from the Cross of Hand near Finford Bridge, in the County of Warwick, through the Town of Southam in the same County, to the Borough of Banbury, in the County of Oxford. (Repealed by Road from Finford Bridge to Banbury Act 1822 (3 Geo. 4. c. xcv))
Road from Leeds to Otley Act 1802 (repealed)	42 Geo. 3. c. xv	24 March 1802
An Act for continuing the Term, and altering and enlarging the Powers of Two Acts, passed in the Twenty eighth Year of the Reign of His late Majesty King George the Second, (Note: Leeds to Otley Road Act 1755 (28 Geo. 2. c. 60)) and in the Twenty first Year of the Reign of His present Majesty, (Note: Leeds to Otley Road Act 1781 (21 Geo. 3. c. 98)) for repairing the several Roads therein mentioned so far as the same relate to the Road from Leeds to Otley in the West Riding of the County of York. (Repealed by Road from Leeds to Otley Act 1821 (1 & 2 Geo. 4. c. xciv))
Road from Shoreditch to the Mile End Turnpike Act 1802 (repealed)	42 Geo. 3. c. xvi	24 March 1802
An Act to continue the Term, and alter and enlarge the Powers of several Acts, passed in the Eleventh, (Note: Shoreditch to Stamford Hill Road Act 1737 (11 Geo. 2. c. 29)) Twenty sixth (Note: Shoreditch Road Act 1753 (26 Geo. 2. c. 55)) and Twenty ninth (Note: Shoreditch to Stamford Hill Road Act 1756 (29 Geo. 2. c. 41)) Years of the Reign of His late Majesty King George the Second, and in the Twenty second Year of the Reign of His present Majesty, (Note: Shoreditch to Stamford Hill Road Act 1782 (22 Geo. 3. c. 115)) for repairing the Road from Shoreditch Church through Hackney to Stamford Hill, and cross Cambridge Heath over Bethnal Green to the Turnpike at Mile End, in the County of Middlesex. (Repealed by Road from Shoreditch Church through Hackney Act 1821 (1 & 2 Geo. 4. c. cxii))
Saltash Roads Act 1802 (repealed)	42 Geo. 3. c. xvii	24 March 1802
An Act for continuing the Term, and altering and enlarging the Powers of Two Acts, passed in the Second (Note: Saltash Roads Act 1762 (2 Geo. 3. c. 44)) and Seventeenth (Note: Saltash Roads Act 1777 (17 Geo. 3. c. 79)) Years of the Reign of His present Majesty, for repairing and widening several Roads in the Counties of Cornwall and Devon, leading to the Borough of Saltash, in the County of Cornwall. (Repealed by Saltash Roads Act 1823 (4 Geo. 4. c. vi))
Galway County Gaol Act 1802	42 Geo. 3. c. xviii	15 April 1802
An Act for Building a new Gaol for the County of Galway, and for purchasing Lands sufficient for the same, and for other Purposes relating thereto.
Downham Market, Wimbotsham, Stow Bardolph and Denver Drainage Act 1802	42 Geo. 3. c. xix	15 April 1802
An Act for draining and improving certain Fen Lands and Low Grounds, within the several Parishes of Downham Market, Wimbotsham, Stow, Bardolph, and Denver, in the County of Norfolk.
Ellesmere and Chester Canal Act 1802 (repealed)	42 Geo. 3. c. xx	15 April 1802
An Act for repealing so much of an Act, passed in the Thirty third Year of His present Majesty, intituled "An Act for making and maintaining a Navigable Canal from the River Severn at Shrewsbury, in the County of Salop, to the River Mersey, at or near Netherpool, in the County of Chester, and also for making and maintaining certain Collateral Cuts from the said intended Canal," (Note: Ellesmere and Chester Canal Act 1793 (33 Geo. 3. c. 91)) as restrains the Company of Proprietors of the said Canal from taking Tonnage on Coals, Coak, Culm, Lime or Limestone, upon a Part of the said Canal; and for authorizing the said Company of Proprietors to raise a Sum of Money to make up the Amount of their original Subscription; and for further amending the several Acts passed, relative to the making of the said Canal. (Repealed by Ellesmere and Chester Canal Act 1827 (7 & 8 Geo. 4. c. cii))
Roads from Barnsley Common and from Barugh (Yorkshire) Act 1802 (repealed)	42 Geo. 3. c. xxi	15 April 1802
An Act for continuing the Term, and altering and enlarging the Powers of Two Acts, passed in the Thirty second Year of the Reign of His late Majesty King George the Second, (Note: Yorkshire Roads Act 1758 (32 Geo. 2. c. 70)) and in the Eighteenth Year of the Reign of His present Majesty King George the Third, (Note: Yorkshire Roads Act 1778 (18 Geo. 3. c. 96)) for repairing and widening the Road leading from the East Side of Barnsley Common, in the County of York, to the Middle of Grange Moor, and from thence to White Cross, and also the Road from the Guide Post in Barugh, to a Rivulet called Barugh Brook, and from thence for Two hundred Yards over and beyond the same Rivulet or Brook, into the Township of Cawthorne, in the said County. (Repealed by Roads from Barnsley Common and from Barugh (Yorkshire) Act 1823 (4 Geo. 4. c. lxvi))
Runham Inclosure Act 1802	42 Geo. 3. c. xxii	15 April 1802
An Act for dividing, allotting, inclosing, draining and preserving the Open Fields, Marsh Lands, Fens, Commons and Waste Grounds, within the Parish of Runham, in the County of Norfolk.
Road from Horsham Act 1802 (repealed)	42 Geo. 3. c. xxiii	15 April 1802
An Act for continuing the Term, and altering and enlarging the Powers of Two Acts, One passed in the Twenty eighth Year of the Reign of His late Majesty King George the Second, (Note: Sussex and Surrey Roads Act 1755 (28 Geo. 2. c. 45)) and the other in the Sixteenth Year of the Reign of His present Majesty, (Note: Surrey and Sussex Roads Act 1776 (16 Geo. 3. c. 70)) for widening and repairing the Road leading from Horsham, in the County of Sussex, through Capell, Dorking, Mickleham and Leatherhead, to the Watch House in Ebisham, in the County of Surrey; and from Capell to Stone Street, in the Parish of Ockley, in the said County of Surrey. (Repealed by Road from Horsham to Epsom Act 1823 (4 Geo. 4. c. lxxxvi))
Bedford Level (South Level, Second District) Drainage Act 1802	42 Geo. 3. c. xxiv	15 April 1802
An Act for amending and rendering more effectual so much of an Act passed in the Thirteenth Year of the Reign of His present Majesty, intituled "An Act for draining and preserving certain Fen Lands and Low Grounds lying in the South Level, Part of the great Level of the Fens commonly called Bedford Level, between certain old Rivers or Drains, called Stoke River and Brandon River, and a certain Level or District called Feltwell New District and The Hard Lands of Woodhall-in-Helgay, and Helgay, in the Counties of Norfolk and Suffolk," (Note: Bedford Level (Drainage) (No. 2) Act 1772 (13 Geo. 3. c. 45)) as relates to the Fen and Low Grounds lying within the Second District or Division described in the said Act.
Trent and Mersey Canal (Railways) Act 1802 (repealed)	42 Geo. 3. c. xxv	15 April 1802
An Act to enable the Company of Proprietors of the Navigation from the Trent to the Mersey, to make Railways, to alter the Course of the Railway from Froghall to Caldon, and Part of the Course of the Canal from Froghall to Uttoxeter; and to amend the Trent and Mersey Canal Acts. (Repealed by Trent and Mersey Canal Act 1831 (1 Will. 4. c. lv))
Otley, Skipton and Colne Roads Act 1802 (repealed)	42 Geo. 3. c. xxvi	15 April 1802
An Act for continuing the Term, and altering and enlarging the Powers of Two Acts, passed in the Twenty eighth Year the Reign of His late Majesty King George the Second, (Note: Leeds to Otley Road Act 1755 (28 Geo. 2. c. 60)) and in the Twenty first Year of the Reign of His present Majesty, (Note: Skipton Roads Act 1781 (21 Geo. 3. c. 95)) for repairing several Roads therein described, so far as the same relate to the Roads from Otley to Skipton, in the County of York, and from Skipton aforesaid to Colne, in the County Palatine of Lancaster; and for altering the Course or Direction of certain Parts of the said Road from Otley to Skipton aforesaid. (Repealed by Road from Otley to Skipton Act 1823 (4 Geo. 4. c. xxxi))
Dundee Two Pennies Scots Act 1802 (repealed)	42 Geo. 3. c. xxvii	15 April 1802
An Act for enlarging the Term and Powers granted by several Acts for laying a Duty of Two Pennies Scots upon every Pint of Ale and Beer brewed and vended within the Town of Dundee, and the Liberties and Suburbs thereof. (Repealed by Statute Law (Repeals) Act 2013 (c. 2))
St. Mary Islington Poor Relief Act 1802 (repealed)	42 Geo. 3. c. xxviii	15 April 1802
An Act to amend and render more effectual an Act, made in the Seventeenth Year of His present Majesty's Reign, (Note: Islington (Poor Relief, etc.) Act 1776 (17 Geo. 3. c. 5)) for the better Relief and Employment of the Poor of the Parish of St Mary Islington, in the County of Middlesex. (Repealed by St. Mary Islington Improvement Act 1824 (5 Geo. 4. c. cxxv))
Alrewas Inclosure Act 1802	42 Geo. 3. c. xxix	15 April 1802
An Act for dividing, allotting, inclosing and improving certain Open Meadows, Commonable Lands, and Waste Grounds, within or belonging to the Manor or Parish of Alrewas, in the County of Stafford.
Rhoshirwaun Inclosure Act 1802	42 Geo. 3. c. xxx	15 April 1802
An Act for dividing, allotting and inclosing a Tract of Common and Waste Lands, called Rhoshirwaun, situate in the several Parishes of Aberdaron, Llanfaelrhys and Bryncroes, in the County of Caernarvon.
Richmond (Yorkshire) Inclosure Act 1802	42 Geo. 3. c. xxxi	15 April 1802
An Act for dividing, allotting and inclosing the several Open Fields, Stinted Pasture and Common, within the Parish of Richmond, in the North Riding of the County of York.
Kempston Inclosure Act 1802	42 Geo. 3. c. xxxii	15 April 1802
An Act for dividing, allotting and inclosing the Open and Common Fields, Meadows, Pastures and other Commonable Lands and Waste Grounds, in the Parish of Kempston, in the County of Bedford.
Kelso Two Pennies Scots Act 1802 (repealed)	42 Geo. 3. c. xxxiii	30 April 1802
An Act for continuing and enlarging the Term and Powers of Two several Acts, of the Thirty-second Year of the Reign of His late Majesty, (Note: Kelso Beer Duties Act 1758 (32 Geo. 2. c. 56)) and of the Twentieth Year of His present Majesty, (Note: Kelso Beer Duties Act 1780 (20 Geo. 3. c. 11)) charging a Duty of Two-pennies Scots, or One Sixth Part of a Penny Sterling, upon every Scots Pint of Ale, Porter, and Beer, brewed for Sale, brought into, tapped, or sold, within the Town and Parish of Kelso, in the County of Roxburgh, for the Purposes therein mentioned. (Repealed by Statute Law (Repeals) Act 2013 (c. 2))
Mountjoy Square (Dublin) Improvement Act 1802	42 Geo. 3. c. xxxiv	30 April 1802
An Act for inclosing and improving Mountjoy Square in the Parish of Saint George, in the County of Dublin.
Somersetshire Coal Canal Navigation Act 1802	42 Geo. 3. c. xxxv	30 April 1802
An Act for enabling the Company of Proprietors of the Somersetshire Coal Canal Navigation, to vary and alter the Lines of the said Canal; to raise Money for completing the said Canal and Works; and to alter and amend the Powers and Provisions the several Acts passed for making the said Canal.
Road from Westwood Gate to Barton Seagrove Act 1802	42 Geo. 3. c. xxxvi	30 April 1802
An Act for continuing the Term, and altering and enlarging the Powers of Two several Acts passed in the Twenty seventh Year of the Reign of His late Majesty King George the Second, (Note: Bedford and Northamptonshire Roads Act 1754 (27 Geo. 2. c. 33)) and in the Twenty first Year of the Reign of His present Majesty, (Note: Northamptonshire Roads Act 1781 (21 Geo. 3. c. 94)) for repairing and widening the High Road from Westwood Gate in the Parish of Knotting, in the County of Bedford, through the Towns of Rushden and Higham Ferrers, and over Artleborough Bridge, to the Turnpike Road in Barton Seagrave Lane in the Parish of Barton Seagrave, in the County of Northampton.
Road from Kettering to Newport Pagnell Act 1802 (repealed)	42 Geo. 3. c. xxxvii	30 April 1802
An Act for continuing the Term, and altering and enlarging the Powers of Three several Acts passed in the Twenty seventh Year of the Reign of His late Majesty King George the Second, and in the Thirteenth and Twenty first Years of the Reign of His present Majesty, for repairing and widening the Road leading from the Toll Gate in the Parish of Kettering, through the Town of Wellingborough, in the County of Northampton, and through Olney, over Sherrington Bridge, to Newport Pagnell, in the County of Bucks; and for repairing and widening or rebuilding the said Sherrington Bridge. (Repealed by Road from Kettering to Newport Pagnell Act 1823 (4 Geo. 4. c. lxvii))
Banbury, Brailes and Barcheston Road Act 1802 (repealed)	42 Geo. 3. c. xxxviii	30 April 1802
An Act for amending, widening, turning, altering, improving and keeping in Repair, the Road leading from the Turnpike Road in the Horse Fair, in the Town of Banbury, in the County of Oxford, through Swalcliffe in the said County of Oxford, and through Brailes in the County of Warwick, to the Bridge crossing the River Stour, in the Parish of Barcheston, in the said County of Warwick. (Repealed by Banbury, Brailes and Barcheston Road Act 1823 (4 Geo. 4. c. cv))
Wrexham and Barnhill Road Act 1802 (repealed)	42 Geo. 3. c. xxxix	30 April 1802
An Act for continuing the Term, and altering and enlarging the Powers of an Act, passed in the Twenty second Year of the Reign of his present Majesty, intituled "An Act for amending, widening and keeping in Repair, the Road from Wrexham, in the County of Denbigh, to Barnhill, in the County of Chester;" (Note: Wrexham to Barnhill Road Act 1782 (22 Geo. 3. c. 105)) and for making, amending and keeping in Repair, the Road branching out of the said Road at a Place called Pwll-y-rhwyd, in the said County of Denbigh, to the Borough of Holt, in the same County. (Repealed by Wrexham and Barnhill Road and Branch Act 1823 (4 Geo. 4. c. xlv))
Road from Beattock to the River Sark Act 1802 (repealed)	42 Geo. 3. c. xl	30 April 1802
An Act for making and maintaining a new Road, to extend from or near to a Place called Beattock, in the Parish of Kirkpatrick Juxta, in the County of Dumfries by the Boroughs of Lochmaben and Annan, to the River of Sark, at or near to the present Bridge there. (Repealed by Roads in Dumfries Act 1819 (59 Geo. 3. c. cx))
Duke of Norfolk's Estate Act 1802	42 Geo. 3. c. xli	30 April 1802
An Act for vesting several Messuages and Hereditaments in Sheffield in the County of York, and divers detached Parts of the settled Estates of the most noble Charles Duke of Norfolk, in Trustees, upon Trust to sell; and for laying out the Monies in the Purchase of more convenient Estates, and otherwise.
Egton-with-Newland Inclosure Act 1802	42 Geo. 3. c. xlii	30 April 1802
An Act for dividing, allotting, inclosing and appropriating the Commons, Waste Grounds and Mosses, within the Manor or Township of Egton with Newland in the Parish of Ulverston, in the County Palatine of Lancaster.
Tinmouth Castle Lighthouse Act 1802	42 Geo. 3. c. xliii	4 May 1802
An Act for improving the Tinmouth Castle Light House and Light; and for authorizing additional Light Duties in respect of such Improvement.
Ashby-de-la-Zouch and Tutbury Road Act 1802 (repealed)	42 Geo. 3. c. xliv	4 May 1802
An Act for continuing the Term, and altering and enlarging the Powers of two several Acts, passed in the Twenty sixth Year of the Reign of his late Majesty King George the Second, (Note: Leicester Roads Act 1753 (26 Geo. 2. c. 46)) and in the Nineteenth Year of the Reign of his present Majesty, (Note: Ashby-de-la-Zouch and Tutbury Road Act 1779 (19 Geo. 3. c. 85)) for repairing the Road from Ashby-de-la-Zouch, in the County of Leicester, through Burton upon Trent, in the County of Stafford, and to the Cock Inn in Tutbury, in the said County. (Repealed by Ashby-de-la-Zouch and Tutbury Road Act 1824 (5 Geo. 4. c. ci))
Newent Roads Act 1802 (repealed)	42 Geo. 3. c. xlv	4 May 1802
An Act for making and maintaining a Turnpike Road from a Place called The Crown Hill, in the Town of Newent, in the County of Gloucester, to join the Turnpike Road leading from the City of Hereford, towards Newnham, in the County of Gloucester; and also another Road leading from the Bottom of Kilcott Hill, in the Parish of Newent aforesaid, towards the Town and Forest of Deane, in the County of Gloucester, with a Branch from the same towards Ledbury, in the County of Hereford. (Repealed by Roads from Newent Act 1824 (5 Geo. 4. c. xi))
Walpole's Estate Act 1802	42 Geo. 3. c. xlvi	4 May 1802
An Act for authorizing the Trustees of the Will of the Honourable Richard Walpole to sell certain Parts of his Copyhold Estates, in the County of Norfolk, for the payment of his Debts.
Aberdeen City Gaol Act 1802	42 Geo. 3. c. xlvii	7 May 1802
An Act for building and maintaining a House of Correction in and for the City and County of Aberdeen, and for raising a Fund for defraying the Charges of apprehending, prosecuting and subsisting Criminals, Rogues and Vagabonds, found within the said City and Liberties thereof.
Kilmarnock Improvement Act 1802 (repealed)	42 Geo. 3. c. xlviii	7 May 1802
An Act for opening several new Streets in the Town of Kilmarnock and County of Ayr; for altering and widening some of the Streets, Lanes and Passages within the said Town; for building two new Bridges over the Water of Kilmarnock; for removing the present Slaughter-houses in the said Town, and building new ones, and a Town-hall and Guard-house; for enlarging and repairing the Gaol or Tolbooth; for enlarging the Burial Ground of the said Town for paving the said Town; and Places adjoining thereto, and removing Nuisances and Annoyances therein; and for extending the Jurisdiction of the Magistrates of the said Town over certain adjacent Lands. (Repealed by Kilmarnock Municipal Extension and Improvement Act 1871 (34 & 35 Vict. c. lxxi))
Port of London Improvement and City Canal Act 1802 (repealed)	42 Geo. 3. c. xlix	7 May 1802
An Act to authorize the Advancement of further Sums of Money out of the Consolidated Fund, for completing the Canal, and other Works, which by an Act passed in Thirty ninth Year of his present Majesty's Reign, intituled "An Act for rendering more commodious, and for better regulating the Port of London," (Note: Port of London Improvement and City Canal Act 1799 (39 Geo. 3. c. lxix)) were directed to be made and done by the Mayor, Aldermen, and Commons of the City of London, in Common Council assembled. (Repealed by Thames Conservancy Act 1894 (57 & 58 Vict. c. clxxxvii))
Holderness Drainage Act 1802 or the Keyingham Drainage Act 1802	42 Geo. 3. c. l	7 May 1802
An Act to repeal an Act, passed in the Twelfth Year of the Reign of His present Majesty King George the Third, intituled, "An Act for draining the Low Grounds and Carrs lying in the several Parishes, Townships, and Places of Keyingham, Keyingham-Marsh, Ryhill and Camerton, Burstwick and Skeckling, Burton-Pidsea and Ridgmont, Ottringham, Halsham, Owstwick, Rooss, Rimswell, Tunstall, Waxholme, Elsternwick, Lelley, Humbleton, Fitling, Hilston, Garton, Albrough, Flinton, and Tansterne, within the Seigniory of Holderness, and East Riding of the County of York;" (Note: Holderness Drainage Act 1772 (12 Geo. 3. c. 64 Pr.)) and to render more effectual the Drainage of all and singular the Lands and Grounds within the said several Parishes, Townships, and Places, and within all other Townships, Hamlets, and Places within or Parcel or Member of the several Parishes mentioned, or any of them respectively.
Bangor Ferry and Pentre Voelas Road Act 1802 (repealed)	42 Geo. 3. c. li	7 May 1802
An Act for amending, widening, improving and keeping in Repair, the Road leading from, or nearly from, Porthaethwy Ferry, otherwise called Bangor Ferry, in the County of Caernarvon, to or near to Pentre Voelas, in the Parish of Llanufydd, in the County of Denbigh, (Repealed by Shrewsbury to Holyhead Roads Act 1819 (59 Geo. 3. c. 30))
Stockbridge, Winchester, Bishop's Waltham and Southampton Roads Act 1802 (repealed)	42 Geo. 3. c. lii	7 May 1802
An Act for altering, amending and enlarging the Powers of so much of an Act, passed in the Forty first Year of the Reign of His present Majesty, (Note: Stockbridge, Winchester, Bishop's Waltham and Southampton Roads Act 1801 (41 Geo. 3. (U.K.) c. xcv)) for repairing the Roads from the Town of Stockbridge, in the County of Southampton, to the City of Winchester, and from the said City through Bellmour Lane, to the Top of Stephens Castle Down, near the Town of Bishop's Waltham, in the said County, and from the said City of Winchester through Otterborne to Bar Gate, in the Town and County of the Town of Southampton; as relates to the South District of the Southampton Road. (Repealed by Stockbridge, Winchester and Southampton Roads Act 1823 (4 Geo. 4. c. xv))
Williams' Estate Act 1802	42 Geo. 3. c. liii	7 May 1802
An Act for vesting Part of the Estates of John Williams Esquire, devised by the Will of Peckham Williams Esquire, deceased, in Trustees, to be sold for discharging an Incumbrance thereon.
Lefevre's Estate Act 1802	42 Geo. 3. c. liv	7 May 1802
An Act for vesting the Entirety of certain Hereditaments in the County of Middlesex, and an undivided Moiety of certain other Hereditaments in the same County, respectively devised in strict Settlement by the Will of John Lefevre Esquire, deceased, in Charles Shaw Lefevre Esquire, and his Heirs; and for settling the Entirety of certain Messuages, Lands, and Hereditaments, in the County of Southampton, in lieu thereof, and to the like Uses.
Highways and Bridges in Wigtownshire Act 1802 (repealed)	42 Geo. 3. c. lv	24 May 1802
An Act for repealing an Act, passed in the Eighteenth Year of His present Majesty's Reign, intituled, "An Act for repairing the Highways and Bridges in the County of Wigtown;" (Note: Wigtown Roads Act 1778 (18 Geo. 3. c. 7)) and for the more effecсtually amending, widening, altering, repairing, and keeping in Repair, the Road from the High Bridge of Cree, by Newton Douglas, Glenluce, and Stranraer, to Portpatrick, and from Stranraer to the Confine's of the County of Ayr, near the Cairn of Lochryan; and for levying a Conversion Money in lieu of the Statute Labour, and otherwise regulating the making and repairing the High Roads and Bridges in the said County. (Repealed by Wigtownshire Roads Act 1865 (28 & 29 Vict. c. ccxii))
Chatham Workhouse and Poor Relief Act 1802 (repealed)	42 Geo. 3. c. lvi	24 May 1802
An Act for enlarging the present, or providing an additional Workhouse for the Parish of Chatham, in the County of Kent, for raising Money for that Purpose for the better ascertaining and collecting the Poor Rates; and for the better Relief, Government and Employment of the Poor of the said Parish. (Repealed by County of Kent Act 1981 (c. xviii))
Norwich Workhouse Act 1802	42 Geo. 3. c. lvii	24 May 1802
An Act for altering and enlarging the Powers of an Act, made in the Tenth Year of the Reign of Her late Majesty Queen Anne, intituled "An Act for erecting a Workhouse in the City and County of the City of Norwich, for the better Employment and maintaining the Poor there," (Note: Norwich Poor Act 1711 (10 Ann. c. 15)) so far as the same relates to the erecting a new Workhouse within the said City and County, for the better Maintenance of the Poor thereof.
Somerset Drainage and River Axe Navigation Act 1802	42 Geo. 3. c. lviii	24 May 1802
An Act for draining, preserving from Water, and improving certain Low Lands and Grounds, lying within the several Parishes or Chapelries of Wookey, Westbury, Rodney Stoke, Wedmore, Mear, Weare, Nyland, Badgworth, Biddisham, East Brent, South Brent, Cheddar, Axbridge, Compton Bishop, Loxton, Bleadon, Brean, Berrow and Lympsham, all in the County of Somerset; and for altering and improving the Navigation of the River Axe, within the said Parishes of Bleadon, Lympsham, Loxton, East Brent, Compton Bishop, Biddisham, Badgworth, Weare and Axbridge, some or one of them, above and from a certain Place called Southern Mead Barrs, situate within the said Parish of Bleadon.
Roads from Stretford's Bridge and Mortimer's Cross, Hereford Act 1802 (repealed)	42 Geo. 3. c. lix	24 May 1802
An Act for continuing the Term, and altering and enlarging the Powers, of an Act passed in the Twenty first Year of the Reign of His present Majesty, (Note: Hereford Roads Act 1781 (21 Geo. 3. c. 105)) intituled "An Act for continuing the Term of an Act, made in the Thirty second Year of the Reign of His late Majesty King George the Second, (Note: Hereford and Salop Roads Act 1758 (32 Geo. 2. c. 66)) intituled 'An Act for amending and widening the Roads leading from Stretford's Bridge, in the County of Hereford, to the New Inn, in the Parish of Winstanstow, in the County of Salop, and also the Road from Bluemantle Hall, near Mortimer's Cross, to Aymstrey, in the said County of Hereford; and for repealing so much of an Act, made in the Twenty second Year of the Reign of His present Majesty, (Note: Leominster Roads Act 1748 (22 Geo. 2. c. 15)) as relates to the Road from Mortimer's Cross to Aymstrey Bridge.'" (Repealed by Stretford's Bridge and Cross Moor Roads (Herefordshire and Salop.) Act 1824 (5 Geo. 4. c. cxlii))
Henley Bridge Roads Act 1802 (repealed)	42 Geo. 3. c. lx	24 May 1802
An Act for continuing the Term, and altering and enlarging the Powers of several Acts, passed in the Ninth and Twenty eighth Years of the Reign of His late Majesty King George the Second, and in the Twenty first Year of the Reign of His present Majesty, for repairing and widening certain Roads therein described, so far as the same relate to the Road from Henley Bridge, (Note: Henley Bridge in Henley-on-Thames. 51°32′15″N 0°54′01″W) in the County of Oxford, to Dorchester Bridge, and from thence to Culham Bridge, and to a Place called Mile Stone, in the Road leading to Magdalen Bridge, in the said County. (Repealed by Henley-on-Thames, Dorchester and Oxford Roads Act 1821 (1 & 2 Geo. 4. c. xxvi))
Chester and Whitchurch Road Act 1802	42 Geo. 3. c. lxi	24 May 1802
An Act to continue the Term, and alter and enlarge the Powers of Two Acts, passed in the Thirty third Year of the Reign of His late Majesty King George the Second, (Note: Chester to Birmingham Road Act 1759 (33 Geo. 2. c. 51)) and in the Eighteenth Year of the Reign of His present Majesty, (Note: Chester and Whitchurch Roads Act 1778 (18 Geo. 3. c. 86)) for repairing and widening the Road from the Bars at Boughton, within the Liberties of the City of Chester, to Whitchurch, and from thence to Newport in the County of Salop, and several other Roads therein mentioned, so far as the said Acts relate to the Road leading from the Bars at Boughton, within the Liberties of the City of Chester, to Whitchurch aforesaid, being the First District of Roads in the said Acts mentioned.
Worthing and West Grinstead Park Road Act 1802 (repealed)	42 Geo. 3. c. lxii	24 May 1802
An Act for amending, widening, improving and keeping in Repair, the Road leading from Worthing, in the Parish of Broadwater, in the County of Sussex, by Findon, Washington Hill Rock and Ashington Common to Dial Post, and from thence by Nep Castle and Baybridge Lane, to the Steyning Turnpike, at West Grinsted Park, in the said County. (Repealed by Offington Corner and West Grinstead Park Road Act 1823 (4 Geo. 4. c. xxvii))
Roads in Kent and Surrey Act 1802 (repealed)	42 Geo. 3. c. lxiii	24 May 1802
An Act for repealing an Act, passed in the Twenty first Year the Reign of His present Majesty, (Note: Kent and Surrey Roads Act 1781 (21 Geo. 3. c. 100)) for repairing the Roads leading from the Stones End, in Kent Street, in the Parish of Saint George Southwark, to Dartford, and other Roads therein mentioned, in the Counties of Kent and Surrey, and for more effectually repairing and improving the said Roads, and for lighting and watching or guarding the same; and also for increasing the Compositions payable in lieu of Statute Duty, by the Parishes of East Greenwich and Saint Paul Deptford, to the Treasurer of the said Roads. (Repealed by New Cross Turnpike Roads Act 1826 (7 Geo. 4. c. cxxv))
Road from Great Staughton to Lavendon Act 1802 (repealed)	42 Geo. 3. c. lxiv	24 May 1802
An Act for repairing, widening, and altering the Road leading from the South End of Brown's Lane, in the Parish of Great Staughton, in the County of Huntingdon, to the Bedford Turnpike Road in the Parish of Lavendon, in the County of Buckingham. (Repealed by Road from Great Staughton to Lavendon Act 1823 (4 Geo. 4. c. lxxxv))
Road from Maidstone to Cranbrook Act 1802	42 Geo. 3. c. lxv	24 May 1802
An Act for continuing the Term, and altering and enlarging the Powers of Two Acts, One passed in the Thirty third Year of the Reign of His late Majesty King George the Second, (Note: Maidstone to Cranbrook Road Act 1759 (33 Geo. 2. c. 57)) and the other in the Eighth Year of the Reign of His present Majesty, (Note: Maidstone to Cranbrook Road Act 1768 (8 Geo. 3. c. 43)) for amending, widening and keeping in Repair the Road leading from the Thirty nine Mile Stone, at the Upper End of Stone Street, in the Town of Maidstone, in the County of Kent, to a certain Place called Tubbs Lake, in the Parish of Cranbrook, in the said County.
Kidwelly District of Roads Act 1802 (repealed)	42 Geo. 3. c. lxvi	24 May 1802
An Act for continuing the Term, and altering and enlarging the Powers of Two Acts, passed in the Fifth and Nineteenth Years of the Reign of His present Majesty, for repairing, widening and keeping in Repair, the several Roads in the County of Carmarthen, so far as relate to the Kidwelly District of Roads therein mentioned; for discharging the Trustees from the Care of a Part of the Roads within the said District, and for amending, widening, improving and keeping in Repair, the Road leading from the North Side of a Bridge called Pont-y-Gribenlwyd-ar-Gwilly to a Bridge called Pont-ar-ddy-lais, and from thence to the River Loucher, in the Parish of Llanedy, in the County of Carmarthen. (Repealed by Kidwelly District of Roads Act 1824 (5 Geo. 4. c. ii))
Earl of Bute's Estate Act 1802	42 Geo. 3. c. lxvii	24 May 1802
An Act for rectifying a Mistake in a Settlement, made by the Right Honourable John late Earl of Bute, and the Right Honourable Mary Wortley, late Countess of Bute and Baroness Mountstuart, his Wife, both deceased.
Silvertop's Estate Act 1802	42 Geo. 3. c. lxviii	24 May 1802
An Act for vesting the settled Estates of George Silvertop Esquire, in Pont Island, otherwise Pont Ealand, in the County of Northumberland and Winlaton in the County of Durham, in Trustees to be sold; and for applying the Money to arise by such Sale in or toward the Payment of the Debts and Legacies of John Silvertop Esquire, deceased; and for annexing the Rectory and Tythes of the Parish Church of Bywell Saint Peter, in the said County of Northumberland, held by a Lease for Twenty one Years, to the Uses of the Will of the said late John Silvertop; and for vesting in the said George Silvertop several Parts or Shares of certain Coal Mines or Collieries in Stella Kyo Field, Chopwell and the Parish of Ryton, in the said County of Durham, heretofore belonging to the said John Silvertop, mostly held by the like Tenure; and for enabling the said George Silvertop to charge Part of the settled Estates with the Sum of Five thousand Pounds, and to authorize the Executors of the said John Silvertop to pay to the said George Silvertop the Sum of Two hundred and thirty five Pounds, and deliver to him the Household Furniture and other Goods and Chattels, for his own Benefit; and also for vesting his Estate in Minster Acres in the said County of Northumberland, in Trustees, to certain Uses, and to the Uses of the said Will.
Henllan Inclosure Act 1802	42 Geo. 3. c. lxix	24 May 1802
An Act for dividing allotting and inclosing the Commons and Waste Lands, in the Parish of Henllan, in the County of Denbigh.
Mickleton and Romaldkirk Inclosures Act 1802	42 Geo. 3. c. lxx	24 May 1802
An Act for dividing, allotting and inclosing the Moor or Common, Open Fields, Stinted Pastures and other Commonable Lands, within the Township of Mickleton, and Parish of Romaldkirk, in the North Riding of the County of York.
Liverpool Exchange Act 1802	42 Geo. 3. c. lxxi	28 May 1802
An Act for enabling certain Persons in the Town and Port of Liverpool, in the County Palatine of Lancaster, to erect an Exchange there, for the Accommodation of themselves, and the Merchants and others concerned in Trade in the said Town and Port; and for incorporating the Proprietors thereof.
Parish Church of St. Anne, Westminster Act 1802 (repealed)	42 Geo. 3. c. lxxii	28 May 1802
An Act for completing the rebuilding of the Tower of the Parish Church of Saint Anne, within the Liberty of Westminster in the County of Middlesex, and a new Vestry Room, Watch House, Engine House, and Vaults, for the Use of the said Parish; and for repairing the said Church, improving the Church Yard, and making certain Regulations relating to the said Parish. (Repealed by Saint Anne, Soho Act 1965 (c. v))
Temple Bar Improvement Act 1802	42 Geo. 3. c. lxxiii	28 May 1802
An Act for raising a further Sum of Money for carrying into Execution Three several Acts, passed in the Thirty fifth, (Note: Temple Bar, etc. Act 1795 (35 Geo. 3. c. 126)) Thirty eighth, (Note: Temple Bar Improvement Act 1798 (38 Geo. 3. c. lxi)) and in the Thirty ninth and Fortieth (Note: Temple Bar Improvement Act 1800 (39 & 40 Geo. 3. c. xlii)) Years of the Reign of His present Majesty, for widening and improving the Entrance into the City of London, near Temple Bar; and for making a more commodious Street or Passage at Snow Hill; and for raising on the Credit of the Orphans' Fund a Sum of Money for those Purposes; and for explaining, amending and enlarging the Powers of the said Acts.
Catfield and Sutton (Norfolk) Inclosures and Drainage Act 1802	42 Geo. 3. c. lxxiv	28 May 1802
An Act for dividing, allotting and inclosing the Open Fields, Commons and Waste Grounds, within the Parishes of Catfield and Sutton, in the County of Norfolk, and for draining and preserving the said Commons and Waste Grounds.
Devon Roads Act 1802	42 Geo. 3. c. lxxv	28 May 1802
An Act for continuing the Term, and altering and enlarging the Powers of several Acts passed respecting several Roads near the Borough of Ashburton, and the Town of Newton Bushel, and for amending, widening, altering and keeping in Repair, the Road leading from a Place called Moor's Barn to the End of White Hill Lane, in the Parish of Highwick; and for making and maintaining a Road from the Bottom of Dean Clapper Hill at the West End of the Village of Dean Prior, in the Parish of Dean Prior through the Village of Dean Church Town, and from thence through the Parishes of Rattery and South Brent to Brent Bridge, all in the County of Devon.
Surrey and Sussex Roads Act 1802 (repealed)	42 Geo. 3. c. lxxvi	28 May 1802
An Act for repealing an Act, passed in the Twenty fifth Year of the Reign of His present Majesty King George the Third, (Note: Surrey and Sussex Roads Act 1785 (25 Geo. 3. c. 117)) for more effectually repairing the Roads leading from the Stone's End in Blackman Street, in the Borough of Southwark, in the County of Surrey, to Highgate, in the County of Sussex, and several other Roads therein mentioned, and for granting other Powers for those Purposes. (Repealed by Southwark and Highgate (Sussex) Road Act 1828 (9 Geo. 4. c. cxx))
Tyburn, Uxbridge and Brent Bridge Roads Act 1802 (repealed)	42 Geo. 3. c. lxxvii	28 May 1802
An Act for continuing the Term, and altering and enlarging the Powers, of several Acts passed in the First (Note: Repair of Highways between Tyburn and Uxbridge Act 1715 (1 Geo. 1. St. 2. c. 25 Pr.)) and Twelfth (Note: Tyburn and Uxbridge Road Act 1725 (12 Geo. 1. c. 17)) Years of the Reign of King George the First, the Fifteenth Year of the Reign of King George the Second, (Note: Middlesex Roads Act 1741 (15 Geo. 2. c. 9)) and the Seventh (Note: Tyburn and Uxbridge Road Act 1766 (7 Geo. 3. c. 102)) and Thirty fourth (Note: Middlesex Roads Act 1794 (34 Geo. 3. c. 131)) Years of the Reign of His present Majesty, for repairing the Highways between Tyburn and Uxbridge, in the County of Middlesex, and for amending the Road leading from Brent Bridge, over Hanwell Heath, through the Parishes of Hanwell, New Brentford and Ealing, to the Great Western Road, in the said County; and for lighting, watching and watering the Highway between Tyburn and Kensington Gravel Pits. (Repealed by Roads between Tyburn and Uxbridge Act 1826 (7 Geo. 4. c. lxxvi))
Uppleby's Estate Act 1802	42 Geo. 3. c. lxxviii	28 May 1802
An Act for enabling Trustees to make Exchange of a Messuage and other Hereditaments at Scawby, in the County of Lincoln, (Part of the settled Estates of John Uppleby Esquire,) for a Messuage and other Hereditament at Wooton, in the said County of Lincoln.
Westbury Inclosure Act 1802	42 Geo. 3. c. lxxix	28 May 1802
An Act for dividing and allotting in Severalty the Open and Common Arable Fields, Commons, Downs, Common Meadows, Common Pastures, and Commonable Places, within the Parish of Westbury, in the County of Wilts.
Carmarthenshire Railway or Tramroad Company Act 1802 or the Llanelly Railway and Dock Act 1802	42 Geo. 3. c. lxxx	3 June 1802
An Act for making and maintaining a Railway or Tramroad, from or from near a certain Place called The Flats, in the Parish of Llanelly, in the County of Carmarthen, to or near to certain Lime Rocks, called Castell-y-Garreg, in the Parish of Llanfihangel-Aberbythich, in the said County; and for making and maintaining a Dock or Bason at the Termination of the said Railway or Tramroad, at or near the said Place called The Flats.
Welsh Harp and Stone Bridge, and Castle Bromwich and Birmingham Roads Act 1802 (repealed)	42 Geo. 3. c. lxxxi	3 June 1802
An Act to continue the Term, and alter and enlarge the Powers of Two Acts, One passed in the Thirty third Year of the Reign of His late Majesty King George the Second, and the other in the Eighteenth Year of the Reign of His present Majesty, for repairing and widening the Road from the Bars at Boughton, within the Liberties of the City of Chester, to Whitchurch, and from thence to Newport, in the County of Salop, to Ivetsey Bank, in the County of Stafford, and from thence to Castle Bromwich and Stone Bridge, in the Parish of Hampton-in-Arden, in the County of Warwick, and from Castle Bromwich to Birmingham, in the same County; so far as the said Acts relate to the Roads leading from a Place called The Welch Harp, in the Township of Stonnall, in the said County of Stafford, to Stone Bridge, and from Castle Bromwich to Birmingham, being the Fourth District of Roads in the said Acts mentioned. (Repealed by Welsh Harp and Stonebridge, and Castle Bromwich and Birmingham Roads Act 1823 (4 Geo. 4. c. cxxi))
Roads from Liverpool Act 1802 (repealed)	42 Geo. 3. c. lxxxii	3 June 1802
An Act to enlarge the Term, and to amend alter and vary the Powers of an Act passed in the Thirty seventh Year of the Reign of His present Majesty, (Note: Liverpool Prescot and Warrington Roads Act 1797 (37 Geo. 3. c. 158)) intituled "An Act to continue the Term, and alter and enlarge the Powers of an Act of the Eleventh Year of His present Majesty, (Note: Lancaster Roads Act 1771 (11 Geo. 3. c. 91)) for more effectually repairing and amending the Roads from Liverpool to Prescot, Ashton and Warrington, and other Roads therein mentioned, in the County Palatine of Lancaster," and to vary certain Parts of the Line of the said Roads. (Repealed by Roads from Liverpool Act 1821 (1 & 2 Geo. 4. c. xv))
Alfreton and Derby Roads Act 1802 (repealed)	42 Geo. 3. c. lxxxiii	3 June 1802
An Act for widening, altering, improving and repairing the Road leading from Alfreton, in the County of Derby, to the Town of Derby. (Repealed by Alfreton and Derby Road Act 1823 (4 Geo. 4. c. xli))
Prescott's Estate Act 1802	42 Geo. 3. c. lxxxiv	3 June 1802
An Act for exchanging the settled Estate of Sir George Beeston Prescott Baronet, in the County of Chester, for another Estate of greater Value in the County of Flint, to be settled in lieu thereof.
Glover's Estate Act 1802	42 Geo. 3. c. lxxxv	3 June 1802
An Act to enable the High Court of Chancery to authorize and empower the Devisees in Trust under the Will of John Glover late of King Street, in the Parish of Saint George, in the County of Middlesex, Gentleman, to grant a Lease for the Term of Ninety nine Years of the Messuage or Tenement therein mentioned, being Part of the Estate devised by the said Will, pursuant to an Agreement therein recited or for such shorter Term of Years, and upon such other Conditions, as to the said Court shall seem reasonable.
Glasgow Glebe Lands Act 1802	42 Geo. 3. c. lxxxvi	22 June 1802
An Act for feuing the Glebe of the Parish of the Barony of Glasgow, in the County of Lanark.
Prebend of Prees Estate Act 1802	42 Geo. 3. c. lxxxvii	22 June 1802
An Act for exonerating and discharging Parcel of the Possessions of the Prebendary of the Prebend of Prees otherwise Pipa Minor, founded in the Cathedral Church of Litchfield, in the County of Stafford, of and from a certain Lease made thereof; and for authorizing the Sale of the Mines and Minerals within the Premises comprized in such Lease, and for other Purposes.
London Fish Trade Act 1802 (repealed)	42 Geo. 3. c. lxxxviii	22 June 1802
An Act for repealing so much of an Act, made in the second Year of the Reign of His present Majesty, intituled "An Act for the better supplying the Cities of London and Westminster with Fish, and to reduce the present exorbitant Price thereof, and to protect and encourage Fishermen," (Note: Fish Carriage Act 1762 (2 Geo. 3. c. 15)) as limits the Number of Fish to be sold by Wholesale within the said City of London; and for the better Regulation of the Sale of Fish by Wholesale in the Market of Billingsgate, within the said City. (Repealed by Statute Law (Repeals) Act 2013 (c. 2))
Westminster Coal Trade Act 1802 (repealed)	42 Geo. 3. c. lxxxix	22 June 1802
An Act to remove Doubts as to certain Acts relating to the Admeasurement of Coals in the City and Liberty of Westminster and Parts adjacent; and to revive and continue an Act, passed in the Twenty sixth Year of the Reign of His present Majesty, (Note: Westminster Coal Trade Act 1786 (26 Geo. 3. c. 108)) relating to the Admeasurement of Coals within the Limits aforesaid; and to indemnify all Persons who have acted in pursuance of any of the Provisions of the said Act. (Repealed by London, Westminster, Middlesex, Surrey, Kent and Essex Coal Trade Act 1807 (47 Geo. 3 Sess. 2. c. lxviii))
Maidstone Improvement Act 1802 (repealed)	42 Geo. 3. c. xc	22 June 1802
An Act for altering and amending an Act, passed in the Thirty-first Year of the Reign of His present Majesty, intituled, "An Act for widening, improving, regulating, paving, cleansing, and lighting the Streets, Lanes, and other publick Passages and Places within the King's Town of Maidstone in the County of Kent; for removing and preventing Encroachments, Obstructions, Nuisances, and Annoyances therein; for better supplying the said Town with Water; and for repairing the Highways within the Parish of Maidstone;" (Note: Maidstone Improvement Act 1791 (31 Geo. 3. c. 62)) and for raising a further Sum of Money for completing the Purposes of the said Act. (Repealed by Local Government Supplemental Act 1866 (No. 4) (29 & 30 Vict. c. 107))
Kingston-upon-Hull Dock Act 1802	42 Geo. 3. c. xci	22 June 1802
An Act for amending an Act, passed in the Fourteenth Year of the Reign of His present Majesty, intituled "An Act for making and establishing public Quays or Wharf's at Kingston-upon-Hull, for the better securing His Majesty's Revenues of Customs, and for the Benefit of Commerce in the Port of Kingston-upon-Hull; for making a Bason or Dock, with Reservoirs, Sluices, Roads, and other Works, for the Accommodation of Vessels using the said Port; and for appropriating certain Lands belonging to His Majesty, and for applying certain Sums of Money out of His Majesty's Customs at the said Port, for those Purposes; and for establishing other necessary Regulations within the Town and Port of Kingston-upon-Hull;" (Note: Kingston-upon-Hull Dock Act 1774 (14 Geo. 3. c. 56)) and also for making additional Basons or Docks at Kingston-upon-Hull, with an Entrance into the same from the River Humber; and for granting certain Lands belonging to His Majesty in Aid of the said Works.
Dublin Water Act 1802	42 Geo. 3. c. xcii	22 June 1802
An Act for amending, altering, and extending the Powers of the several Acts of Parliament now in force, for supplying the City of Dublin with Water, and for making better Provision for that Purpose.
Bradford (Yorkshire) Canal Navigation's Estate Act 1802	42 Geo. 3. c. xciii	22 June 1802
An Act for vesting divers Estates in the Parishes of Bradford and Calverley, in the West Riding of the County of York, purchased for the Benefit of the Proprietors of the Bradford Canal Navigation, in Trustees, upon certain Trusts, discharged from all Claims of the Crown in respect of any Forfeiture incurred under or by virtue of the Laws or Statutes of Mortmain.
Medway Lower Navigation Act 1802	42 Geo. 3. c. xciv	22 June 1802
An Act for repealing an Act passed in the Thirty second Year of His present Majesty's Reign, (Note: Medway Navigation Act 1792 (32 Geo. 3. c. 105)) for improving the Navigation of the River Medway, from the Town of Maidstone, through the several Parishes of Maidstone, Boxley, Allington and Aylesford, in the County of Kent; and for the better and more effectually improving the Navigation of the said River.
Saxelby, Harby and Broadholm Inclosures Act 1802	42 Geo. 3. c. xcv	22 June 1802
An Act for dividing, inclosing, draining, and preserving the Open Fields, Half Year's Meadow Land, Common Pastures, Moors, and Waste Lands, within the Parish of Saxelby, in the County of Lincoln, and Townſhips of Harby and Broadbolm, in the County of Nottingham.
Boston (Witham) Bridges and Improvement Act 1802	42 Geo. 3. c. xcvi	22 June 1802
An Act to empower the Mayor, Aldermen, and Common Councilmen of the Borough of Boston, in the County of Lincoln, to take down the Bridge over the River Witham in the said Borough, and to erect a Bridge over some other Part of the said River, within the said Borough, and to open and make proper Avenues, Ways, and Passages thereto; and to enlarge and improve the Gaol and House of Correction within the said Borough; and to purchase and take down several Houses for the Purposes aforesaid.
Stirling and Queensferry Road Act 1802	42 Geo. 3. c. xcvii	22 June 1802
An Act for making and repairing the Road from Causewayhead, near Stirling, through the County of Clackmannan, by the Foot of the Ochil Hills, and by West Saline and Crossfoord, towards Queensferry, and certain Roads branching out of the same; and for converting the Statute Labour in the said County of Clackmannan.
Roads from Uttoxeter, Cliff Bank and Lower Lane Act 1802	42 Geo. 3. c. xcviii	22 June 1802
An Act for continuing the Term, and altering and enlarging the Powers of several Acts passed in the Thirty-second Year of the Reign of His late Majesty King George the Second, (Note: Derby to Newcastle-under-Lyne Road Act 1758 (32 Geo. 2. c. 60)) and in the Third (Note: Derby and Uttoxeter Road Act 1763 (3 Geo. 3. c. 57)) and Eighteenth (Note: Stafford Roads Act 1778 (18 Geo. 3. c. 109)) Years of the Reign of His present Majesty, for repairing, widening, and amending the Roads from the Town of Uttoxeter, to the Town of Newcastle-under-Lyme, and from Cliffe Bank to Snape Marsh, and also from Lower Lane to Hem Heath, all in the County of Stafford.
Wirksworth and Hulland Ward Road Act 1802 (repealed)	42 Geo. 3. c. xcix	22 June 1802
An Act for continuing the Term, and altering and enlarging the Powers of an Act, passed in the Thirty-third Year of the Reign of His present Majesty King George the Third, intituled, "An Act for repairing and widening the Road from the Moot Hall in Wirksworth, to the Turnpike Road. leading from Derby to Brassington, at or near to a Place called The Cross in the Hand on Hulland Ward; and also the Road from the said Moot Hall to another Turnpike Road leading from the Cross Post on Wirksworth Moor to Matlock Bath, at or near to a Place called The Steeple House, in the Township of Wirksworth aforesaid, all in the County of Derby." (Note: Derby Roads Act 1793 (33 Geo. 3. c. 152)) (Repealed by Roads from the Wirksworth Turnpike Road Act 1830 (11 Geo. 4 & 1 Will. 4. c. cv))
Road from Dunchurch to Stonebridge Act 1802 (repealed)	42 Geo. 3. c. c	22 June 1802
An Act to continue the Term, and alter and enlarge the Powers of several Acts heretofore passed for repairing the Road from Dunchurch to Stonebridge, in the County of Warwick. (Repealed by Road from Dunchurch to Stonebridge Act 1824 (5 Geo. 4. c. xliii))
Roads from West India Docks Act 1802 or the Commercial Road Act 1802 (repealed)	42 Geo. 3. c. ci	22 June 1802
An Act for making and maintaining, and for watching, lighting, and watering a Road from the West India Docks, in the Isle of Dogs, to communicate with a Street called Church Lane or Church Street, Whitechapel; and for making and maintaining a Branch of Road therefrom, to communicate with Queen Street, in the Parish of Saint Anne, all in the County of Middlesex; for opening, widening, and improving certain Streets and Passages therein mentioned, and for more effectually amending and keeping in Repair, a Road from Ratcliffe Highway through Cannon Street, in the County of Middlesex, into the Road leading into the County of Essex, and also from the West End of Brook Street into Cable Street, and from Upper Shadwell Street into the Back Lane, in the said County of Middlesex. (Repealed by Commercial and East India and Barking Roads Act 1828 (9 Geo. 4. c. cxii))
Viscountess Fane's Estate Act 1802	42 Geo. 3. c. cii	22 June 1802
An Act for authorizing the Persons therein named to concur on the Part of Peter de Salis Esquire, and the other Persons entitled under the Settlement executed by Jerome de Salis Esquire, and Mary his Wife, and the Will of the said Mary de Salis, in making a Partition of certain Estates late of the Right Honourable Susanna Viscountess Fane, situate in the Counties of Armagh, Limerick, and Tipperary, in that Part of the United Kingdom of Great Britain and Ireland called Ireland.
Beardsworth and Williams (Trust) Estates Act 1802	42 Geo. 3. c. ciii	22 June 1802
An Act for vesting certain Trust Estates, Stocks, Funds and Securities, of which John Beardsworth Esquire, and Thomas Williams Esquire, were Trustees, in James Palmer Hobbs Esquire, and George Burley Gentleman.
Whitehead's Estate Act 1802	42 Geo. 3. c. civ	22 June 1802
An Act to enable John Skynner Esquire, and Bigoe Charles Williams Gentleman, on Behalf of John Perry and James Perry, Infants, who are entitled to undivided Shares in certain Copyhold Messuages, Lands and Hereditaments, situate within the Manor of Tottenham otherwise Tottenhall, in the Parish of Saint Pancras, in the County of Middlesex, late the Estate of Catharine Whitehead, deceased, to concur with the Owners of the several other undivided Shares of the same Copyhold Hereditaments in making a Partition and Division thereof; and to enable the said John Skynner and Bigoe Charles Williams to sell or mortgage a competent Part of the Shares of the said Infants therein, and to apply the Money arising thereby, under the Direction of the Court of Chancery, for the Maintenance and Advancement of the said Infants, to make such Surrenders of their Shares as may be necessary.
Paul's Estate Act 1802	42 Geo. 3. c. cv	22 June 1802
An Act for vesting Part of the Estates devised by the Will of John Paul Esquire, situate in the County of Wilts, in John Paul Paul Esquire, in Fee Simple, discharged from the Uses and Trusts of the said Will, in Exchange for an Estate in the County of Gloucester; and for vesting the Residue of the said devised Estates in the County of Wilts in Trustees to be sold, and for applying the Monies to arise by such Sale, under the Direction of the Court of Chancery, in the Purchase of other Estates to be settled in lieu thereof, and to the same Uses.
Sewerby and Marton Inclosures Act 1802	42 Geo. 3. c. cvi	22 June 1802
An Act for dividing, allotting and inclosing the Open and Common Fields, Common Pastures, and other Commonable Lands and Waste Grounds, within the several Townships or Hamlets of Sewerby and Marton, and within the Manor of Sewerby cum Marton, in the Parish of Bridlington, in the East Riding of the County of York.
Flixton Inclosure Act 1802	42 Geo. 3. c. cvii	22 June 1802
An Act for dividing, allotting, and inclosing the Open Arable Fields, Meadows, Pastures, Ings, Carr, Common and Waste Lands and Grounds within the Township of Flixton otherwise Fleeceton, in the Parish of Folkton, in the East Riding of the County of York.
Wildmore Fen Inclosure Act 1802	42 Geo. 3. c. cviii	22 June 1802
An Act for altering, amending and rendering more effectual, an Act passed in the last Session of Parliament, intituled "An Act for dividing and allotting a certain Fen, called Wildmore Fen, in the County of Lincoln;" (Note: Wildmore Fen Allotments Act 1801 (41 Geo. 3. (U.K.) c. cxli)) and for dividing, allotting in Severalty, and inclosing the parochial or general Allotments set out, or to be set out, in pursuance of the said Act, for compensating for the Tythes of such Allotments, and for declaring and determining to what Parish or Parishes the several Allotments of the said Fen shall belong.
Shitlington and Holwell Inclosures Act 1802	42 Geo. 3. c. cix	22 June 1802
An Act for dividing, allotting and inclosing the Common and Open Fields, Common Meadows, and other Commonable Lands and Waste Grounds, in the Parishes of Shitlington and Holwell, in the County of Bedford.
Wirksworth Inclosure and Water Supply Act 1802	42 Geo. 3. c. cx	22 June 1802
An Act for dividing, allotting and inclosing the several Commons and Waste Lands within the Manor and Township of Wirksworth, in the County of Derby; for protecting certain Springs situate on the said Commons and Waste Lands; and for the better securing a Supply of Water for the Use of the Inhabitants of the Town of Wirksworth, in the said County.
River Itchin Navigation Act 1802	42 Geo. 3. c. cxi	26 June 1802
An Act for explaining, amending and rendering more effectual, several Acts of the Sixteenth and Seventeenth Years of the Reign of King Charles the Second, (Note: River Navigation Act 1664 (16 & 17 Cha. 2. c. 13 Pr.)) and of the Seventh (Note: River Itching Navigation Act 1766 (7 Geo. 3. c. 87)) and Thirty fifth (Note: River Itchin Navigation Act 1795 (35 Geo. 3. c. 86)) Years of the Reign of His present Majesty, relating to the Navigation of the River Itchin, in the County of Southampton.
Thurso Harbour Act 1802	42 Geo. 3. c. cxii	26 June 1802
An Act for building and maintaining a Harbour and Pier at the Town and in the Parish of Thurso, in the County of Caithness.
West India Dock Company Act 1802 (repealed)	42 Geo. 3. c. cxiii	26 June 1802
An Act to alter and amend an Act, passed in the Thirty ninth Year of His present Majesty's Reign, intituled "An Act for rendering more commodious and for better regulating the Port of London," (Note: Port of London Improvement Act 1800 (39 & 40 Geo. 3. c. xlvii)) so far as the same relates to the Concerns of the West India Dock Company thereby established, and for extending to other Objects the Compensations directed to be made by the said Act. (Repealed by West India Docks Act 1831 (1 & 2 Will. 4. c. lii))
Glenkens Canal Act 1802	42 Geo. 3. c. cxiv	26 June 1802
An Act for making and maintaining a navigable Canal from the Boat Pool of Dalry in the Glenkenns to the Port and Town of Kirkcudbright, in the Stewartry of Kirkcudbright.
Monmouthshire Canal Navigation Act 1802	42 Geo. 3. c. cxv	26 June 1802
An Act for making and maintaining certain Railways, to communicate with the Monmouthshire Canal Navigation; and for enabling the Company of Proprietors of that Navigation to raise a further Sum of Money to complete their Undertaking; and for explaining and amending the Acts passed in the Thirty-second (Note: Monmouthshire Canal Navigation Act 1792 (32 Geo. 3. c. 102)) and Thirty-seventh (Note: Monmouthshire Canal Navigation Act 1797 (37 Geo. 3. c. 100)) Years of His present Majesty's Reign, relating thereto.
River Ancholme Drainage and Navigation Act 1802	42 Geo. 3. c. cxvi	26 June 1802
An Act for altering and enlarging the Powers of an Act, passed in the Seventh Year of the Reign of His present Majesty, intituled "An Act for the more effectual draining the Lands lying in the Level of Ancholme, in the County of Lincoln, and making the River Ancholme navigable from the River Humber, at or near a Place called Ferraby Sluice, in the County of Lincoln, to the Town of Glamford Briggs, and for continuing the said Navigation up or near to the said River from thence to Bishop Briggs, in the said County of Lincoln." (Note: River Ancholme Navigation and Drainage Act 1766 (7 Geo. 3. c. 98))
Berwick and Durham Roads and Tweed Bridges Act 1802 (repealed)	42 Geo. 3. c. cxvii	26 June 1802
An Act for the more effectually amending, widening, improving and keeping in Repair, the Road from the Turnpike Road at Buckton Burn, in the County of Durham, through Berwick upon Tweed, to Lammerton Hill, and also several other Roads therein mentioned, lying in the said County and within the Liberties of the said Town of Berwick; and also for erecting Two Bridges over the River Tweed, and for making Two Roads from the said Bridges to the Road leading from Berwick aforesaid to Cornhill, in the said County of Durham. (Repealed by Durham and Berwick Roads and Bridges Act 1819 (59 Geo. 3. c. lviii))
Taylor and Otway Estates Act 1802	42 Geo. 3. c. cxviii	26 June 1802
An Act for vesting divers Freehold and Leasehold Messuages, Pieces or Parcels of Ground and Hereditaments, situate in several Parishes in the County of Middlesex, heretofore the Estates of Thomas Taylor Esquire, the Father, and Thomas Taylor Esquire, the Son, both deceased, and several Leasehold Messuages in the same County, heretofore the Estate of Sarah Otway Widow, deceased, in Trustees, to be sold, under the Direction of the High Court of Chancery, and for applying the Purchase Money according to the Directions of the said Court, such Directions to be given upon Application in a summary Way.
Coningsby Inclosure Act 1802	42 Geo. 3. c. cxix	26 June 1802
An Act for dividing, allotting, and inclosing the Open Arable Fields, Meadows, Commons, and other Commonable and Waste Lands, within the Parish of Coningsby otherwise Conesby, in the County of Lincoln.

=== Private acts ===
Short title	Citation	Royal assent
Long title
Hainford Inclosure Act 1802	42 Geo. 3. c. 10 Pr.	24 February 1802
An Act for dividing, allotting and inclosing the Warren, Commons, and Waste Grounds, within the Parish of Hayneford in the County of Norfolk.
Delord's Naturalization Act 1802	42 Geo. 3. c. 11 Pr.	24 February 1802
An Act for naturalizing John Aimé Delord.
Sneaton Inclosure Act 1802	42 Geo. 3. c. 12 Pr.	19 March 1802
An Act for dividing, allotting, and inclosing, the Commons and Waste Lands, within the Parish of Sneaton in the North Riding of the County of York.
Handsworth Inclosure Act 1802	42 Geo. 3. c. 13 Pr.	19 March 1802
An Act for dividing and inclosing the Commons and Waste Lands within the Manor and Parish of Handsworth, in the West Riding of the County of York.
Filby Inclosure Act 1802	42 Geo. 3. c. 14 Pr.	19 March 1802
An Act for dividing, allotting and inclosing the Open Fields, Commons, Doles and Waste Grounds within the Parish of Filby, in the County of Norfolk.
Pitney Inclosure Act 1802	42 Geo. 3. c. 15 Pr.	19 March 1802
An Act for dividing, exchanging, allotting and inclosing the Open and Commonable Lands and Fields within the Parish of Pitney otherwise Pitney Lortie, in the County of Somerset.
Finingham and Gislingham Inclosure Act 1802	42 Geo. 3. c. 16 Pr.	19 March 1802
An Act for dividing, allotting and inclosing the Commons and Waste Grounds within the Parishes of Finingham and Gislingham, in the County of Suffolk.
Albers' Naturalization Act 1802	42 Geo. 3. c. 17 Pr.	19 March 1802
An Act for naturalizing Johann Henrich Albers.
Wittenberg's Naturalization Act 1802	42 Geo. 3. c. 18 Pr.	19 March 1802
An Act for naturalizing Albert Wittenberg.
Buckland Inclosure Act 1802	42 Geo. 3. c. 19 Pr.	24 March 1802
An Act for dividing, allotting and inclosing the Common Fields, Common Meadows, Common Pastures, Downs and all other Commonable Lands and Waste Grounds in the Hamlet or Liberty of Buckland, in the Parish of Buckland, in the County of Berks.
Horningsea Inclosure Act 1802	42 Geo. 3. c. 20 Pr.	15 April 1802
An Act for dividing, allotting and inclosing the Open and Common Fields, Common Meadows, Fen Grounds and other Open and Commonable Lands and Waste Grounds lying in the Parish of Horningsea, in the County of Cambridge.
Wooburn Inclosure Act 1802	42 Geo. 3. c. 21 Pr.	15 April 1802
An Act for dividing, allotting and inclosing the Open and Common Fields, Common Meadows, Common Pastures, Commons and Waste Lands, within the Parish of Wooburn, in the County of Buckingham.
Stratfield Mortimer Inclosure Act 1802	42 Geo. 3. c. 22 Pr.	15 April 1802
An Act for dividing, allotting and inclosing a certain Common or Waste Ground called Mortimer Common, and other Commonable and Waste Lands, in the Manor and Parish of Stratfield Mortimer, in the Counties of Berks and Hants.
Broughton Inclosure Act 1802	42 Geo. 3. c. 23 Pr.	15 April 1802
An Act for dividing and inclosing the Open and Common Fields and all other Commonable Lands, within and belonging to the Hamlet and Tything of Broughton otherwise Drakes Broughton, in the Parish of Holy Cross, in Pershore, in the County of Worcester.
Troddermain, Walton Wood, Askerton, and Lauercost (Cumberland) Inclosure Act 1802	42 Geo. 3. c. 24 Pr.	15 April 1802
An Act for dividing, allotting and inclosing the Moors, Commons and Waste Grounds, in the Manors of Troddermain, Walton Wood, Askerton and Lanercost, all in the Parish of Lanercost, in the County of Cumberland.
West Aston and Middleton (Hampshire) Inclosure Act 1802	42 Geo. 3. c. 25 Pr.	15 April 1802
An Act for dividing, allotting and inclosing the Open and Common Fields, Common Pastures, and Waste Grounds within or belonging to the Hamlets or Tythings of West Aston otherwise West Yaston and Middleton, in the Parish of Long Parish, in the County of Southampton.
Cropwell Bishop or Great Cropwell (Nottinghamshire) Inclosure Act 1802	42 Geo. 3. c. 26 Pr.	15 April 1802
An Act for dividing, allotting and inclosing the Moors, Commons and Waste Grounds, in the Manors of Troddermain, Walton Wood, Askerton and Lanercost, all in the Parish of Lanercost, in the County of Cumberland.
Pakenham Inclosure Act 1802	42 Geo. 3. c. 27 Pr.	15 April 1802
An Act for dividing, allotting and inclosing the Open and Commonable Fields, Lammas and Commonable Meadows, Heaths, Fens and Waste Grounds, within the Parish of Pakenham, in the County of Suffolk.
Ellingham, Broome, Kirby Cane, and Geldestone (Norfolk) Inclosure Act 1802	42 Geo. 3. c. 28 Pr.	15 April 1802
An Act for dividing, allotting and inclosing the Open Fields, Half Year or Shack Lands, Lammas Meadows, Fen Grounds, Commons and Waste Lands, within the several Parishes of Ellingham, Broome, Kirby Cane and Geldestone, in the County of Norfolk.
Sawston Inclosure Act 1802	42 Geo. 3. c. 29 Pr.	15 April 1802
An Act for dividing, allotting, laying in Severalty and inclosing the Open and Common Fields, Common Meadows and other Open and Commonable Lands and Waste Grounds within the Parish of Sawston, in the County of Cambridge.
Brightwell Baldwin Inclosure Act 1802	42 Geo. 3. c. 30 Pr.	15 April 1802
An Act for dividing, allotting and inclosing the Open and Common Fields, and other Commonable and Waste Lands within the Parish of Baldwin Brightwell, in the County of Oxford.
Silkstone, Hoyland Swaine, and Cawthorne (Yorkshire, West Riding) Inclosure Act 1802	42 Geo. 3. c. 31 Pr.	15 April 1802
An Act for dividing, allotting and inclosing, the Open Fields, Mesne Inclosures, Commons and Waste Grounds, within the several and respective Manors and Townships of Silkstone, Hoyland Swaine and Cawthorne, in the Parish of Silkstone, in the West Riding of the County of York.
Sotherton Moor Inclosure Act 1802	42 Geo. 3. c. 32 Pr.	15 April 1802
An Act for dividing and inclosing a certain Piece or Parcel of Common Pasture Land called Sotherton Moor, in the Parish of Sotherton, in the County of Suffolk.
Kolle's Naturalization Act 1802	42 Geo. 3. c. 33 Pr.	15 April 1802
An Act for naturalizing Henrich Kolle.
Duke of Argyll's Estate Act 1802	42 Geo. 3. c. 34 Pr.	30 April 1802
An Act to enable John Duke of Argyll to exchange certain Lands, Parts of his entailed Estate in the Shire of Argyll, for certain other Lands belonging to him in Fee Simple, lying in the Shires of Argyll and Clackmannan.
Kempsford and Dryffield Inclosure Act 1802	42 Geo. 3. c. 35 Pr.	30 April 1802
An Act for altering, amending, and rendering more effectual, an Act passed in the thirty-ninth Year of the Reign of his present Majesty, intituled "An Act for dividing, allotting, and inclosing, the Open and Common Fields, Common Meadows, Common Pastures, and Waste Lands, within the Parishes of Kempsford and Dryffield in the County of Gloucester;" (Note: Kempsford and Dryffield Inclosure Act 1799 (39 Geo. 3. c. 109 Pr.)) and for enlarging and extending the Powers of the Commissioners in the said Act named.
Abbotts Morton Inclosure Act 1802	42 Geo. 3. c. 36 Pr.	30 April 1802
An Act for dividing, allotting and inclosing the Open and Common Fields, Meadows, Commonable Lands and Waste Grounds, within the Parish of Abbotts Morton, in the County of Worcester.
Hargrave Inclosure Act 1802	42 Geo. 3. c. 37 Pr.	30 April 1802
An Act for dividing and inclosing the Open and Common Fields, and other Commonable Places, within the Parish of Hargrave, in the County of Northampton.
Weston-by-Welland and Sutton Bassett (Northamptonshire) Inclosure Act 1802	42 Geo. 3. c. 38 Pr.	30 April 1802
An Act for dividing, allotting and inclosing the Open and Common Fields, Meadows, Common Pastures and other Commonable and Waste Lands, in the Parish, Township or Hamlets, of Weston by Welland and Sutton Bassett, in the County of Northampton.
Oaksey Common Inclosure Act 1802	42 Geo. 3. c. 39 Pr.	30 April 1802
An Act for dividing, allotting and inclosing a certain Tract of Common or Waste Land, called Oaksey Common, situate within, or belonging to, the Manor of Oaksey, in the County of Wilts.
Great Barton Inclosure Act 1802	42 Geo. 3. c. 40 Pr.	4 May 1802
An Act for dividing, allotting and inclosing the whole Year or every Year Lands, Common Fields, Half Year or Shack Lands, Heaths, Commonable Lands, Commons and Waste Grounds, within the Parish of Great Barton, in the County of Suffolk.
Up-Lambourne Inclosure Act 1802	42 Geo. 3. c. 41 Pr.	4 May 1802
An Act for dividing, allotting and laying in Severalty, the Open and Common Arable Lands, Common Meadow, Common Pasture, Common Down, Waste and other Commonable Lands and Grounds, within the Township or Hamlet of Up Lambourne, in the Parish of Chipping Lambourne, in the County of Berks.
Harwell Inclosure Act 1802	42 Geo. 3. c. 42 Pr.	4 May 1802
An Act for dividing, allotting and laying in Severalty the Open and Common Arable Lands, and for dividing, allotting and laying in Severalty, and inclosing the Open and Common Meadow, Common Pasture, Waste and other Commonable Lands and Grounds within the Parish of Harwell, in the County of Berks.
Christchurch Inclosure Act 1802	42 Geo. 3. c. 43 Pr.	4 May 1802
An Act for dividing, allotting and inclosing certain Commonable Lands and Waste Grounds within the Parish of Christchurch and Parish or Chapelry of Holdenhurst, in the County of Southampton.
Everton and Everton-cum-Tetworth (Bedfordshire, Huntingdonshire, Cambridgeshire) Inclosure Act 1802	42 Geo. 3. c. 44 Pr.	4 May 1802
An Act for dividing, allotting and inclosing the Common Field, Wastes and other Commonable Lands in the Township or Hamlet of Everton, within the Parish of Everton cum Tetworth, in the Counties of Bedford, Huntingdon and Cambridge, some or one of them, and for extinguishing all the Tythes arising within the Township or Hamlet of Everton aforesaid.
Cleckheaton and Scholes (Yorkshire, West Riding) Inclosure Act 1802	42 Geo. 3. c. 45 Pr.	4 May 1802
An Act for dividing, allotting and inclosing the several Commons, Moors and Waste Grounds, within the Division or Hamlets of Cleckheaton and Scholes, in the Manor and Township of Cleckheaton, in the Parish of Birstall, in the West Riding of the County of York.
Nuneaton and Stockingford (Warwickshire) Inclosure Act 1802	42 Geo. 3. c. 46 Pr.	4 May 1802
An Act for dividing, allotting and inclosing the Commons and Waste Lands lying within the Manor or Manors of Nuneaton and Stockingford, in the Parish of Nuneaton, in the County of Warwick, and also a certain Stinted Pasture in Nuneaton aforesaid, called The Cottiers otherwise Cottagers Piece.
Merthyr Tydvil (Glamorgan) Rectorial Glebe Act 1802	42 Geo. 3. c. 47 Pr.	7 May 1802
An Act to enable the Rector of the Parish and Parish Church of Merthyr Tydvil, in the County of Glamorgan, for the Time being, to grant Leases of the Glebe belonging to the said Rectory.
West Horsley Inclosure Act 1802	42 Geo. 3. c. 48 Pr.	7 May 1802
An Act for dividing, allotting and inclosing the Open Common Arable Field, Commons and Waste Lands, within the Parish and Manor of West Horsley, in the County of Surrey
Manningford Inclosure Act 1802	42 Geo. 3. c. 49 Pr.	7 May 1802
An Act for dividing, allotting and inclosing the Open and Common Fields, Common Meadow, Common Down, and other Open and Common Lands and Waste Ground, within the Manor of Manningford otherwise Manningford Bohun, in the Parish of Wilsford, in the County of Wilts.
Du Mont's Naturalization Act 1802	42 Geo. 3. c. 50 Pr.	7 May 1802
An Act for naturalizing James Lewis Du Mont.
Oliver and John Colt and David Mushet Estates Act 1802	42 Geo. 3. c. 51 Pr.	24 May 1802
An Act for confirming a Feu Contract made between Oliver Colt Esquire, as Tutor of Law to John Hamilton Colt his Nephew, an Infant, and David Mushet, of certain Parts of the Lands of Eastern and Western Garturk, situate in the County of Lanark, in North Britain.
Hunt's Estate Act 1802	42 Geo. 3. c. 52 Pr.	24 May 1802
An Act for confirming the Sale and Conveyance to John Feilden Esquire, of certain Estates in the County of Chester, devised by the Will of Thomas Hunt Esquire, deceased, and for substituting and settling in lieu thereof certain Estates of Anna Maria Hunt, in the County of Cornwall; and for vesting the Purchase Money for the said Estates in the County of Chester in the said Anna Maria Hunt, in Consideration of such Substitution and Settlement of the said Estates in the County of Cornwall.
Hamond's Estate Act 1802	42 Geo. 3. c. 53 Pr.	24 May 1802
An Act for vesting Part of the settled Estates of William Parker Hamond Esquire, in the County of Cambridge, in Trustees, to be sold; and for laying out the Money arising by such Sale in the Purchase of other Lands and Hereditaments to be settled in lieu thereof to the like Uses.
Chapman's Estate Act 1802	42 Geo. 3. c. 54 Pr.	24 May 1802
An Act for vesting the settled Estate of Richard Chapman Gentleman, and Ann his Wife, in the County of Somerset, in Trustees, to be exchanged for an unsettled Estate in the same County.
Fenstanton Inclosure Act 1802	42 Geo. 3. c. 55 Pr.	24 May 1802
An Act for dividing, allotting and inclosing the Open and Common Fields, Meadows, Lands, Commons and Commonable Places, within the Parish of Fenstanton, in the County of Huntingdon.
Rolleston Inclosure Act 1802	42 Geo. 3. c. 56 Pr.	24 May 1802
An Act for dividing, allotting and inclosing the Commons and Waste Grounds within the Parish of Rolleston, in the County of Stafford.
Halvergate Inclosure Act 1802	42 Geo. 3. c. 57 Pr.	24 May 1802
An Act for dividing, allotting and inclosing the Commons Fens, and Waste Grounds, within the Parish of Halvergate, in the County of Norfolk.
Whatcote Inclosure Act 1802	42 Geo. 3. c. 58 Pr.	24 May 1802
An Act for dividing, allotting and inclosing the Open and Common Fields, Common Meadows, Common Pastures, Commons, Waste and other Commonable Lands and Grounds, within the Manor and Parish of Whatcote, in the County of Warwick.
Oldham Inclosure Act 1802	42 Geo. 3. c. 59 Pr.	24 May 1802
An Act for dividing, allotting and inclosing the Commons and Waste Grounds within the Township of Oldham, in the Parish of Prestwich cum Oldham, in the County Palatine of Lancaster.
Saltley and Washwood (Warwickshire) Inclosure Act 1802	42 Geo. 3. c. 60 Pr.	24 May 1802
An Act for dividing, allotting and inclosing the Open and Common Fields, Meadows, Warren and Waste Lands within the Hamlet of Saltley and Washwood, in the Parish of Aston, near Birmingham, in the County of Warwick.
Swerford Inclosure Act 1802	42 Geo. 3. c. 61 Pr.	24 May 1802
An Act for dividing, allotting and inclosing the Open and Common Fields, Commons, Waste and other Commonable Lands and Grounds, within the Liberties and Precincts of Swerford, in the Parish of Swerford, in the County of Oxford.
Swinscoe Inclosure Act 1802	42 Geo. 3. c. 62 Pr.	24 May 1802
An Act for dividing, allotting and inclosing the several Commons, Waste Grounds and Open Common Lands, within the Lordship or Liberty of Swinscoe, in the Parish of Bloor, in the County of Stafford.
Denton Inclosure Act 1802	42 Geo. 3. c. 63 Pr.	24 May 1802
An Act for dividing, allotting and inclosing the Open and Common Fields, Meadows, Lands, Commons, Marsh Grounds and Commonable Places, within the Parish of Denton, in the County of Huntingdon.
Birbury and Marton (Warwickshire) Inclosure Act 1802	42 Geo. 3. c. 64 Pr.	24 May 1802
An Act for dividing, allotting and inclosing the Open Fields and Commonable Lands within the Parishes of Birbury and Marton, in the County of Warwick.
Cardington Inclosure Act 1802	42 Geo. 3. c. 65 Pr.	24 May 1802
An Act for dividing and allotting the Common Fields, Common Meadows, Wastes and other Commonable Lands, in the Parish of Cardington, in the County of Bedford.
Ellerton Inclosure Act 1802	42 Geo. 3. c. 66 Pr.	24 May 1802
An Act for dividing, allotting and inclosing the Open Fields, Ings, Meadows, Pastures, Commons and Waste Grounds, within the Township of Ellerton, in the Parish of Ellerton, in the East Riding of the County of York.
Ranskill and Scrooby (Northamptonshire) Inclosure Act 1802	42 Geo. 3. c. 67 Pr.	24 May 1802
An Act for dividing, allotting and inclosing the Open Arable Fields, Meadows, Pastures, Commons and Waste Grounds, within the Township or Liberty of Ranskill, in the Parish of Blyth, and the Township and Parish of Scrooby, in the County of Nottingham.
Worthington, Breedon-on-the-Hill, and Newbold (Leicestershire) Inclosure Act 1802	42 Geo. 3. c. 68 Pr.	24 May 1802
An Act for dividing, allotting and inclosing the several Open Fields, Meadows, Commons and Waste Grounds, within the Manors of Worthington and Breedon on the Hill, and Township of Newbold, all in the Parish of Breedon on the Hill, in the County of Leicester.
Sinfin Moor Inclosure Act 1802	42 Geo. 3. c. 69 Pr.	24 May 1802
An Act for dividing, allotting and inclosing a certain Common or Waste Ground, called Sinfin Moor, and certain Common Meadows thereto adjoining, all in the County of Derby.
Churcham Inclosure Act 1802	42 Geo. 3. c. 70 Pr.	24 May 1802
An Act for dividing, allotting and inclosing the Waste Grounds, Open Fields and Meadows, and Commonable and intermixed Lands, within that Part of the Parish of Churcham which lies within the Manor of Churcham, in the County of Gloucester.
Hinxworth Inclosure Act 1802	42 Geo. 3. c. 71 Pr.	24 May 1802
An Act for dividing, allotting and inclosing the Open and Common Fields, Common Pastures, Wastes and other Commonable Lands, in the Parish of Hinxworth, in the County of Hertford, and for extinguishing all the Tythes arising within the said Parish.
Doxat's Naturalization Act 1802	42 Geo. 3. c. 72 Pr.	24 May 1802
An Act for naturalizing James Emanuel Francis Doxat.
Jain's Naturalization Act 1802	42 Geo. 3. c. 73 Pr.	24 May 1802
An Act for naturalizing John Benjamin Jain.
Scrope's Estate Act 1802	42 Geo. 3. c. 74 Pr.	28 May 1802
An Act for vesting the Estates late of Frederick James Scrope Esquire, deceased, in the County of Lincoln, and devised by his Will in Trustees to be sold, and for applying Part of the Monies arising from the Sale thereof in Discharge of Incumbrances, and for laying out the Residue in the Purchase of other Estates, to be settled to the same Uses.
Hamilton's Estate Act 1802 (repealed)	42 Geo. 3. c. 75 Pr.	28 May 1802
An Act for vesting the Lands and Estates of Saltcoats, Kingston, Williamston, Barncluth, Udston, Birdsfield, Bellsfield and Syde, and Superiority thereof, and Lands of Dechmont, and others, Teinds and Pertinents thereof, comprized in the Deed of Entail executed by the deceased Alexander Hamilton of Pencaitland Esquire, upon the Thirty first Day of January One thousand seven hundred and forty seven, in Trustees, in Trust to sell the same, and invest the Money arising by such Sale in the Purchase of other Lands, to be settled and secured to the same Series of Heirs, and under the same Conditions and Limitations as are contained in the aforesaid Deed of Entail. (Repealed by Lady Ruthven's Estate Act 1840 (3 & 4 Vict. c. 24 Pr.))
Effingham East Court Inclosure Act 1802	42 Geo. 3. c. 76 Pr.	28 May 1802
An Act for dividing, allotting and inclosing that Part of Effingham Upper Common which lies in the Manor of Effingham East Court, in the Parish of Effingham, in the County of Surrey.
Tharston Inclosure Act 1802	42 Geo. 3. c. 77 Pr.	28 May 1802
An Act for dividing, allotting and inclosing the Commons and Waste Grounds, within the Parish of Tharston, in the County of Norfolk.
Styrrup, Oldcoats, Farworth and Norney (Nottinghamshire) Inclosure Act 1802	42 Geo. 3. c. 78 Pr.	28 May 1802
An Act for dividing, allotting and inclosing the several Open Fields, Meadows, Pastures Commons and Waste Grounds, and all other the Open and Uninclosed Lands and Grounds within the Townships of Styrrup, Oldcoats and Farworth, and so much of Norney as is within the Liberty of Styrrup aforesaid, in the Parishes of Blyth and Harworth, or one of them, in the County of Nottingham.
Daventry Inclosure Act 1802	42 Geo. 3. c. 79 Pr.	3 June 1802
An Act for dividing and inclosing the Open and Common Fields, Common Pastures, Common Meadows and other Commonable Lands and Grounds, within the Manor, Parish and Liberties of Daventry, in the County of Northampton.
Graveley Inclosure Act 1802	42 Geo. 3. c. 80 Pr.	3 June 1802
An Act for dividing, allotting and inclosing the Open and Common Fields, Common Meadows, and other Open and Commonable Lands and Waste Grounds within the Parish of Graveley, in the County of Cambridge.
Spelsbury Inclosure Act 1802	42 Geo. 3. c. 81 Pr.	3 June 1802
An Act for dividing, allotting and inclosing the Open and Common Fields, Common Pastures, Commons, Waste Grounds, Downs and other Commonable Lands, within the Parish of Spelsbury, in the County of Oxford.
Uphaven Inclosure Act 1802	42 Geo. 3. c. 82 Pr.	3 June 1802
An Act for dividing, allotting and inclosing the Open and Common Fields, Common Meadows, Common Pastures, Open and Common Downs, and other Commonable Lands and Waste Ground within the Manor and Parish of Uphaven, in the County of Wilts.
Moulsoe Inclosure Act 1802	42 Geo. 3. c. 83 Pr.	3 June 1802
An Act for dividing, allotting and inclosing the Open and Common Arable Fields, Meadows, Pastures, Commons, Wastes and other Commonable Lands and Grounds in the Parish of Moulsoe, in the County of Buckingham.
Coombe Bissett Inclosure Act 1802	42 Geo. 3. c. 84 Pr.	3 June 1802
An Act for dividing, allotting and laying in Severalty certain Open Commonable Fields, Downs, Meadows and Waste Lands within the Parish of Coombe Bisset otherwise Byset, in the County of Wilts.
West Grinstead and White Parish (Wiltshire) Inclosure Act 1802	42 Geo. 3. c. 85 Pr.	3 June 1802
An Act for dividing, allotting and laying in Severalty certain Open Commonable Fields, Downs, Meadows and Waste Lands, within the Parishes of West Grinstead and White Parish, in the County of Wilts.
Withernwick Inclosure Act 1802	42 Geo. 3. c. 86 Pr.	3 June 1802
An Act for dividing, allotting and inclosing the Open Arable Fields, Meadows, Pastures and Commons within the Township of Withernwick, in the Parish of Withernwick, in the East Riding of the County of York.
De Vandes' Naturalization Act 1802	42 Geo. 3. c. 87 Pr.	3 June 1802
An Act for naturalizing Alexandre de Vandes, commonly called Compte de Vandes.
Downshire's Estate Act 1802	42 Geo. 3. c. 88 Pr.	22 June 1802
An Act for authorizing Leases to be made of such of the settled Estates of the late Most Honourable Arthur Marquis of Downshire, deceased, as are situate in that Part of the United Kingdom called Ireland.
Earl of Aylesford's and Worcester Cathedral Estates Act 1802	42 Geo. 3. c. 89 Pr.	22 June 1802
An Act for effectuating an Exchange between the Right Honourable Heneage Earl of Aylesford and the Dean and Chapter of Worcester.
Lord Mulgrave's Estate Act 1802	42 Geo. 3. c. 90 Pr.	22 June 1802
An Act for enabling the Right Honourable Henry Lord Mulgrave to charge his settled Estates with a Jointure, in Consideration of the Improvements made by him, and also for enabling him to charge the same Estates with Portions for younger Children when he shall have made further Improvements, and for other Purposes.
Delancy's Estate Act 1802	42 Geo. 3. c. 91 Pr.	22 June 1802
An Act for vesting in Oliver Delancy Esquire, (Note: Oliver De Lancey (British Army officer, died 1822).) Barrack Master General, a Wharf and certain other Hereditaments near Maidstone, in the County of Kent, late the Estates of Ann Maynard and Mary Maynard, both deceased.
Sir Charles and Charles Morgan's Estates Act 1802	42 Geo. 3. c. 92 Pr.	22 June 1802
An Act to enable Sir Charles Morgan Baronet, and Charles Morgan Esquire, to grant Leases of certain Estates in the County of Monmouth, devised by the Will of the late John Morgan Esquire; and to enable the said Charles Morgan, under the Direction of the Court of Chancery, to charge the Estates of which he is Tenant for Life in Possession under the said Will, with the Amount of the Monies laid out by him in building Wharfs, and in other Improvements.
Honourable Ann Fairfax's Estate and Gilling East Parish Church Act 1802	42 Geo. 3. c. 93 Pr.	22 June 1802
An Act to establish and confirm an Exchange made by and between the Honourable Ann Fairfax, Lady of the Manor of Gilling East, in the County of York, Spinster, (since deceased,) and the Rector of the Parish Church of Gilling East aforesaid, with the Consent and Approbation of His Grace the Archbishop of York, of certain Tythes, Cattlegates, Customary Payments, and other Rights belonging to the said Rector, in Right of the said Church, for certain Parcels of Demesne Lands which belonged to the said Ann Fairfax, as Lady of the said Manor.
Robinson's Estate Act 1802	42 Geo. 3. c. 94 Pr.	22 June 1802
An Act for vesting the Manor of Northill and several Messuages and Hereditaments in the Parish of Northill, in the County of Bedford, Part of the settled Estates of John Robinson Esquire, in Trustees, upon Trust to sell, and for laying out the Monies in the Purchase of more convenient Estates in the County of Suffolk.
Philips's Estate Act 1802	42 Geo. 3. c. 95 Pr.	22 June 1802
An Act for enabling the Guardian of Elizabeth Henrietta Philips Spinster, an Infant, to sell and convey in Fee Farm her undivided Fourth Part, or join with the Owners of the other Shares in selling and conveying in Fee Farm the Intirety of several Plots or Parcels of Land in Manchester, in the County of Lancaster, under yearly reserved Rents, for the Purpose of building upon.
Dundas's Estate Act 1802	42 Geo. 3. c. 96 Pr.	22 June 1802
An Act for enabling the Trustees therein named to lay out the Money arising from the Sale of a Moiety of certain Estates in the Counties of Norfolk and Suffolk, which was settled on the Marriage of Robert Dundas Esquire, and Ann his Wife, in the Purchase of Hereditaments situate in Scotland, in the Manner and upon the Trusts in the said Act mentioned.
Earl of Buckinghamshire's Estate Act 1802	42 Geo. 3. c. 97 Pr.	22 June 1802
An Act for effecting the Sale or Exchange of Estates in the County of Norfolk, late of John Earl of Buckinghamshire, deceased, and for laying out the Monies thence arising in the Purchase of other Estates, and for felling Timber on the settled Estates late of the said Earl in the same County, and laying out the Monies thence arising in planting certain Parts thereof.
Kelby, Aisby, Oseby, and Haydor (Lincolnshire) Inclosure Act 1802	42 Geo. 3. c. 98 Pr.	22 June 1802
An Act for dividing and inclosing the Open Fields, Half Year Meadow Land, Common Pastures, Heath and Waste Lands in the Townships of Kelby, Aisby and Oseby, and in the Parish of Haydor, in the County of Lincoln.
West Challow Inclosure Act 1802	42 Geo. 3. c. 99 Pr.	22 June 1802
An Act for dividing, allotting and inclosing the Open and Common Fields, Common Pastures and other Commonable and Waste Lands in the Manor and Hamlet of West Challow, in the Parish of Letcombe Regis, in the County of Berks.
Alvaston and Boulton (Derbyshire) Inclosure Act 1802	42 Geo. 3. c. 100 Pr.	22 June 1802
An Act for dividing, allotting and inclosing the several Open Fields, Meadows, Pastures, Commons and Waste Grounds within or belonging to the Parishes or Townships of Alvaston and Boulton, in the County of Derby.
Thurlby Inclosure Act 1802	42 Geo. 3. c. 101 Pr.	22 June 1802
An Act for dividing, allotting and inclosing the Open Common Fields, Meadows, Pastures, Fen, Wastes and other Commonable Lands within the Parish of Thurlby, in the County of Lincoln.
Keyingham in Holderness Inclosure Act 1802	42 Geo. 3. c. 102 Pr.	22 June 1802
An Act for dividing, allotting and inclosing the Open Arable Fields, Meadow and Pasture Grounds, within the Township and Parish of Keyingham in Holderness, in the East Riding of the County of York, and for making Compensation for the Tythes thereof, and also for the Tythes of certain ancient inclosed Lands within the said Township and Parish.
Chellaston Inclosure Act 1802	42 Geo. 3. c. 103 Pr.	22 June 1802
An Act for dividing, allotting and inclosing the Open Fields, Common Meadows and Waste Grounds within or belonging to the Parish of Chellaston, in the County of Derby.
Kennington, Sunningwell, and Radley (Berkshire) Inclosure Act 1802	42 Geo. 3. c. 104 Pr.	22 June 1802
An Act for dividing, allotting, laying in Severalty and inclosing the Open and Common Arable Lands, Common Meadow, Common Pasture, Waste and other Commonable Lands and Grounds within the Township of Kennington, in the Parishes of Sunningwell and Radley, in the County of Berks.
Walkeringham Inclosure Act 1802	42 Geo. 3. c. 105 Pr.	22 June 1802
An Act for dividing allotting and inclosing the Open Fields, Meadows, Pastures, Moors, Commons and Waste Lands, and all other Open and Uninclosed Grounds within the Lordship and Parish of Walkeringham, in the County of Nottingham.
Gooderstone Inclosure Act 1802	42 Geo. 3. c. 106 Pr.	22 June 1802
An Act for dividing, allotting and inclosing sundry Tracts or Parcels of Whole Year Land, Common Fields, Half Year or Shack Lands, Lammas Meadows, Heaths, Warren, Commons and Waste Grounds, within the Parish of Gooderstone, in the County of Norfolk.
Newton Inclosure Act 1802	42 Geo. 3. c. 107 Pr.	22 June 1802
An Act for dividing, allotting and inclosing the Common or Waste situate in the Manor of Newton, in the County Palatine of Lancaster.
St. Giles Cambridge Inclosure Act 1802	42 Geo. 3. c. 108 Pr.	22 June 1802
An Act for dividing, allotting, laying in Severalty, and inclosing, the Open and Common Fields, Common Meadows, and other Open and Commonable Lands and Waste Grounds, within the Parish of Saint Giles, in the Town of Cambridge in the County of Cambridge.
Dinton Inclosure Act 1802	42 Geo. 3. c. 109 Pr.	22 June 1802
An Act for dividing and inclosing the Open and Common Fields, Common Meadows and other Commonable Lands and Grounds within the Parish of Donington otherwise Dinton, in the County of Buckingham.
Bodenham Inclosure Act 1802	42 Geo. 3. c. 110 Pr.	22 June 1802
An Act for dividing, allotting and inclosing the Commons, Fields and Common Meadows in the Parish of Bodenham, in the County of Hereford.
Folkton, and East and West Flotmanby (Yorkshire, East Riding) Inclosure Act 1802	42 Geo. 3. c. 111 Pr.	22 June 1802
An Act for dividing, allotting and inclosing certain Open Common Fields, Ing Lands, Carr Lands, Wastes and Commonable Places within the Township of Folkton, and within the respective Hamlets or Districts of East Flotmanby and West Flotmanby, in the Parish of Folkton, in the East Riding of the County of York.
Hannington Inclosure Act 1802	42 Geo. 3. c. 112 Pr.	22 June 1802
An Act for dividing, allotting and inclosing the Open and Common Fields, Common Meadows, Common Pastures, Commonable Lands and Waste Grounds within the Parish of Hannington, in the County of Northampton.
Yskeibion Inclosure Act 1802	42 Geo. 3. c. 113 Pr.	22 June 1802
An Act for dividing, allotting and inclosing the Commons and Waste Grounds within the Township of Yskeibion, in the Parish of Llanynys, in the County of Denbigh.
Ferry's Naturalization Act 1802	42 Geo. 3. c. 114 Pr.	22 June 1802
An Act for naturalizing Gabriel Dennis Ferry.
Droop's Naturalization Act 1802	42 Geo. 3. c. 115 Pr.	22 June 1802
An Act for naturalizing John Abraham Droop.
Meybohm's Naturalization Act 1802	42 Geo. 3. c. 116 Pr.	22 June 1802
An Act for naturalizing John Meybohm.
Bilston Curacy Estate Act 1802	42 Geo. 3. c. 117 Pr.	26 June 1802
An Act for authorizing the leasing of Mines within the Lands belonging to the perpetual Curacy of Bilston in the County of Stafford, and for authorizing Exchanges to be made of Part of the said Lands under the Direction of the Court of Chancery.
Crofton Green Inclosure Act 1802	42 Geo. 3. c. 118 Pr.	26 June 1802
An Act for dividing, allotting, laying in Severalty and inclosing the Open and Commonable Lands, Common Fields, Common Meadows, Common Pastures and Crofton Green, within the Township of Crofton, in the West Riding of the County of York.
Bonham's Divorce Act 1802	42 Geo. 3. c. 119 Pr.	26 June 1802
An Act to dissolve the Marriage of George Bonham Esquire, with Paulina Lushington his now Wife, and to enable him to marry again, and for other Purposes therein mentioned.
Loggin's Name Act 1802	42 Geo. 3. c. 120 Pr.	26 June 1802
An Act for enabling the Reverend William Loggin to take and use the Surname and Arms of Cole, pursuant to the Will of his Uncle Edward Cole Esquire, deceased.

=== Sources ===
- Raithby, John (1802). "42° Geo. III". The Statutes of the United Kingdom of Great Britain and Ireland. Vol. 1. Containing the Acts 41 Geo. III. (1801.) and 42 Geo. III. (1802.). London: Eyre and Strahan. pp. 277–791 – via Google Books.
- "42° George III.". The Statutes of the United Kingdom of Great Britain and Ireland. Vol. The First. From A.D. 1801, 41 George III.—To AD 1803, 43 George III. London: Eyre and Strahan. 1804. pp. 257–653 – via Google Books.
- "42° George III.". The Statutes of the United Kingdom of Great Britain and Ireland. Vol. The First. From A.D. 1801, 41 George III.—To AD 1803, 43 George III. London: Eyre and Strahan. 1804. pp. 257–653 – via HathiTrust.
- Journal of the House of Commons. Vol. 57. London: His Majesty's Stationery Office. pp. 3–663.
- Chronological Table of and Index to the Statutes. Vol. 1: To the End of the Session 59 Vict. Sess. 2 (1895) (13th ed.). London: Her Majesty's Stationery Office. 1896. pp. 171–174 – via Google Books.
- "Statutes of the United Kingdom of Great Britain and Ireland, 1802". Irish Statute Book. Office of the Attorney General, Government of Ireland.

== 43 Geo. 3 ==
The first session of the 2nd Parliament of the United Kingdom, which met from 16 November 1802 until 12 August 1803.

This session was also traditionally cited as 43 G. 3.

=== Public general acts ===
Short title	Citation	Royal assent
Long title
Negotiations of Notes and Bills Act 1802 (repealed)	43 Geo. 3. c. 1	17 December 1802
An act for further suspending, until the Expiration of six Weeks after the Commencement of the next Session of Parliament, the Operation of two Acts, made in the fifteenth (Note: Negotiations of Notes and Bills Act 1775 (15 Geo. 3. c. 51)) and seventeenth (Note: Bills of Exchange Act 1776 (17 Geo. 3. c. 30)) Years of the Reign of his present Majesty, for restraining the Negotiation of Promissory Notes and Bills of Exchange, under a limited Sum, within that Part of Great Britain called England. (Repealed by Statute Law Revision Act 1872 (35 & 36 Vict. c. 63))
Militia (Ireland) Act 1802 (repealed)	43 Geo. 3. c. 2	17 December 1802
An Act for the more speedy and effectual Enrolment of the Militia of Ireland; and for filling up Vacancies therein. (Repealed by Statute Law Revision Act 1861 (24 & 25 Vict. c. 101))
Duties on Malt, etc. Act 1802 (repealed)	43 Geo. 3. c. 3	17 December 1802
An act for continuing and granting to his Majesty certain Duties upon Malt, Mum, Cyder, and Perry, for the Service of the Year One thousand eight hundred and three. (Repealed by Statute Law Revision Act 1872 (35 & 36 Vict. c. 63))
Duties on Pensions, etc. Act 1802 (repealed)	43 Geo. 3. c. 4	17 December 1802
An act for continuing and granting to his Majesty a Duty on Pensions, Offices, and Personal Estates in England, Wales, and the Town of Berwick-upon-Tweed; and certain Duties on Sugar, Malt, Tobacco, and Snuff, for the Service of the Year One thousand eight hundred and three. (Repealed by Statute Law Revision Act 1872 (35 & 36 Vict. c. 63))
Loans or Exchequer Bills (No. 5) Act 1802 (repealed)	43 Geo. 3. c. 5	17 December 1802
An act for raising the Sum of five Millions by Loans or Exchequer Bills, or the Credit of such Aids or Supplies as have been or shall be granted by Parliament for the Service of Great Britain, for the Year One thousand eight hundred and three. (Repealed by Statute Law Revision Act 1872 (35 & 36 Vict. c. 63))
Indemnity (No. 2) Act 1802 (repealed)	43 Geo. 3. c. 6	17 December 1802
An act to indemnify such Persons as have omitted to qualify themselves for Offices and Employments; and to indemnify Justices of the Peace, or others, who have omitted to register or deliver in their Qualifications within the Time directed by Law, and for extending the Time limited for those Purposes, until the twenty-fifth Day of December One thousand eight hundred and three; to indemnify Members and Officers, in Cities, Corporations, and Borough Towns, whose Admissions have been omitted to be stamped according to Law, or having been stamped, have been lost or mislaid, and for allowing them, until the twenty-fifth Day of December One thousand eight hundred and three, to provide Admissions duly stamped; and to permit such Persons as have omitted to make and file Affidavits of the Execution of Indentures of Clerks to Attornies and Solicitors, to make and file the same on or before the first Day of Michaelmas Term One thousand eight hundred and three. (Repealed by Promissory Oaths Act 1871 (34 & 35 Vict. c. 48))
Navy, Victualling and Transport Bills Act 1802 (repealed)	43 Geo. 3. c. 7	29 December 1802
An act to amend an Act made in the thirty-seventh Year of the Reign of his present Majesty, intituled, "An act to provide for the more speedy Payment of all Navy, Victualling, and Transport Bills that shall be issued in future." (Note: Navy Victualling and Transport Bills Act 1796 (37 Geo. 3. c. 26)) (Repealed by Statute Law Revision Act 1861 (24 & 25 Vict. c. 101))
Baking Trade, Dublin Act 1802 (repealed)	43 Geo. 3. c. 8	29 December 1802
An act for reviving and continuing for five Years from the passing thereof, and from thence to the End of the then next Session of Parliament, certain Acts, passed in the Parliament of Ireland, for regulating the Baking Trade in the City and County of Dublin; and for indemnifying all Persons who have acted in pursuance of any of the Provisions of the said Acts, or any of them. (Repealed by Statute Law Revision Act 1872 (35 & 36 Vict. c. 63))
Militia Pay (Ireland) Act 1802 (repealed)	43 Geo. 3. c. 9	29 December 1802
An act to rectify a Mistake in an Act made in the forty-second Year of the Reign of his present Majesty, intituled, "An act for defraying the Charge of the Pay of the Militia of Ireland, until the twenty fifth Day of March One thousand eight hundred and three; and for holding Courts Martial on Serjeant Majors, Serjeants, Corporals, and Drummers for Offences committed during the Time such Militia shall not be embodied," (Note: Militia (Ireland) (No. 2) Act 1802 (42 Geo. 3. c. 118)) relative to the Pay of Serjeants, Corporals, and Drummers. (Repealed by Statute Law Revision Act 1872 (35 & 36 Vict. c. 63))
Militia (Exemption of Religious Teachers) Act 1802 (repealed)	43 Geo. 3. c. 10	29 December 1802
An act to amend so much of an Act, made in the forty-second Year of the Reign of his present Majesty, intituled, "An act for amending the Laws relating to the Militia in England, and for augmenting the Militia," (Note: Militia Act 1802 (42 Geo. 3. c. 90)) as relates to the Exemption of licensed Teachers of any separate Congregation from serving in the Militia. (Repealed by Territorial Army and Militia Act 1921 (11 & 12 Geo. 5. c. 37))
Drawbacks and Bounties Act 1802 (repealed)	43 Geo. 3. c. 11	29 December 1802
An act for discontinuing certain Drawbacks and Bounties on the Exportation of Sugar from Great Britain, and for allowing other Drawbacks and Bounties in lieu thereof, until the fifteenth Day of January One, thousand eight hundred and four. (Repealed by Statute Law Revision Act 1872 (35 & 36 Vict. c. 63))
Exportations, etc. Act 1802 (repealed)	43 Geo. 3. c. 12	29 December 1802
An act to continue, until the first Day of January One thousand eight hundred and four, several Laws relating to the prohibiting the Exportation and permitting the Importation of Corn, and for allowing the Importation of other Articles of Provision without Payment of Duty; to the Relief of Captors of Prizes, with respect to the bringing and landing certain Prize Goods in this Kingdom; and to the regulating the Trade and Commerce to and from the Isle of Malta. (Repealed by Statute Law Revision Act 1872 (35 & 36 Vict. c. 63))
Exportations, etc. (No. 2) Act 1802 (repealed)	43 Geo. 3. c. 13	29 December 1802
An act to continue, until the first Day of January One thousand eight hundred and four, so much of an Act, made in the forty-first Year of the Reign of his present Majesty, (Note: Exportation, etc. Act 1801 (41 Geo. 3. (U.K.) c. 36)) as relates to the prohibiting the Exportation from Ireland of Corn or Potatoes, or other Provisions; and for permitting the Importation into Ireland of Corn, Fish, and Provisions, without Payment of Duty. (Repealed by Statute Law Revision Act 1872 (35 & 36 Vict. c. 63))
Trade Between Great Britain and Ireland Act 1802 (repealed)	43 Geo. 3. c. 14	29 December 1802
An act for continuing, until the first Day of July One thousand eight hundred and three, an Act, made in the forty-second Year of the Reign of his present Majesty, intituled, "An act for regulating, until the fifteenth Day of February One thousand eight hundred and three, the Prices at which Grain, Meal, and Flour may be exported from Great Britain to Ireland, and from Ireland to Great Britain;" (Note: Trade Between Great Britain and Ireland Act 1802 (43 Geo. 3. c. 14)) and for permitting, from and after the passing thereof, until the said first Day of July One thousand eight hundred and three, the Exportation of Seed Corn from Great Britain to Ireland, and the Importation of Malt into Great Britain from Ireland. (Repealed by Statute Law Revision Act 1872 (35 & 36 Vict. c. 63))
Transportation (No. 2) Act 1802 (repealed)	43 Geo. 3. c. 15	29 December 1802
An act to facilitate, and render more easy the Transportation of Offenders. (Repealed by Transportation Act 1824 (5 Geo. 4. c. 84))
Inquiry into Certain Frauds and Abuses Act 1802 (repealed)	43 Geo. 3. c. 16	29 December 1802
An act for appointing Commissioners to enquire and examine into any Irregularities, Frauds, or Abuses which are or have been practised by Persons employed in the several Naval Departments therein mentioned, and in the Business of Prize Agency; and to report such Observations as shall occur to them for preventing such Irregularities, Frauds, and Abuses; and for the better, conducting and managing the Business of the said Departments, and of Prize Agency, in future. (Repealed by Statute Law Revision Act 1872 (35 & 36 Vict. c. 63))
Drawbacks (No. 2) Act 1802 (repealed)	43 Geo. 3. c. 17	29 December 1802
An act for discontinuing certain Drawbacks and Bounties on the Exportation of Sugar from Ireland, and for allowing, until the fifteenth Day of January One thousand eight hundred and four, other Drawbacks and Bounties instead thereof. (Repealed by Statute Law Revision Act 1872 (35 & 36 Vict. c. 63))

=== Local acts ===
Short title	Citation	Royal assent
Long title
Span Smithy and Talke Road Act 1802 (repealed)	43 Geo. 3. c. i	17 December 1802
An Act for continuing the Term, and altering and enlarging the Powers of an Act, passed in the Twenty-eighth Year of the Reign of His present Majesty, intituled, "An Act for amending, widening, and keeping in Repair, the Road from Spann Smithy in the County of Chester, to Talk in the County of Stafford." (Note: Chester and Stafford Roads Act 1788 (28 Geo. 3. c. 104)) (Repealed by Span Smithy and Talke Road Act 1824 (5 Geo. 4. c. xxv))
Thirsk and Yarm Road Act 1802 (repealed)	43 Geo. 3. c. ii	17 December 1802
An Act for repairing, improving, and maintaining the Road leading from Thirsk to Yarm, in the County of York. (Repealed by Thirsk and Yarm Road Act 1824 (5 Geo. 4. c. vi))
Manchester District of Road Act 1802	43 Geo. 3. c. iii	29 December 1802
An Act for continuing the Term, and altering and enlarging the Powers of an Act, passed in the Thirty-eighth Year of the Reign of His present Majesty, intituled, "An Act for more effectually repairing, widening, altering, and improving the Road from the Town of Manchester, by a Place called The White Smithy, (Note: The White Smithy was located at the junction of the A665 Bury Old Road and the A576 Middleton Road in Crumpsall. 53°30′57″N 2°14′58″W) in the Township of Crumpsall, to the Town of Rochdale; and also the Road from the said Place called The White Smithy, by a place called Besses of the Barn, to the Town of Bury; and also the Road from the said Place called Besses of the Barn, to Radcliffe Bridge; and also the Lane called Sheepfoot-Lane, in the Township of Prestwich, all in the County Palatine of Lancaster;" (Note: Lancashire Roads Act 1798 (38 Geo. 3. c. xi)) so far as the same relates to a certain District of Road therein described, called The Manchester District.

=== Private acts ===
Short title	Citation	Royal assent
Long title
Widmerpool Inclosure Act 1802	43 Geo. 3. c. 1 Pr.	29 December 1802
An Act for dividing allotting and inclosing the Open Fields, Meadows, Pastures, Commonable, and Waste Lands, in the Parish of Widmerpool, in the County of Nottingham.
Olney Inclosure Act 1802	43 Geo. 3. c. 2 Pr.	29 December 1802
An Act for dividing allotting and inclosing two certain Pieces or Parcels of Land or Ground called or known by the several Names of The Pasture and Dogget's Furze, situate in the Parish of Olney, in the County of Buckingham.
Godmanchester Inclosure Act 1802	43 Geo. 3. c. 3 Pr.	29 December 1802
An Act for dividing and inclosing certain Open and Common Fields, Meadows, Lands, Commons, and Commonable Places, within the Parish of Gumecester otherwise Godmanchester, in the County of Huntingdon.
Plantamour's Naturalization Act 1802	43 Geo. 3. c. 4 Pr.	29 December 1802
An Act for naturalizing Francis Theodore Plantamour.
Bellock's Naturalization Act 1802	43 Geo. 3. c. 5 Pr.	29 December 1802
An Act for naturalizing Charles Bellock.
Hosch's Naturalization Act 1802	43 Geo. 3. c. 6 Pr.	29 December 1802
An Act for naturalizing Isaac Hosch.

=== Sources ===
- Pickering, Danby, ed. (1804). The Statutes at Large. Vol. 44, Part 1. 43 George III. 1802-3. Cambridge: Cambridge University Press – via HathiTrust.
- "43° George III.". The Statutes of the United Kingdom of Great Britain and Ireland. Vol. The First. From A.D. 1801, 41 George III.—To AD 1803, 43 George III. London: Eyre and Strahan. 1804. pp. 657–1239 – via Google Books.
- "43° George III.". The Statutes of the United Kingdom of Great Britain and Ireland. Vol. The First. From A.D. 1801, 41 George III.—To AD 1803, 43 George III. London: Eyre and Strahan. 1804. pp. 657–1239 – via HathiTrust.
- Journal of the House of Commons. Vol. 58. London: His Majesty's Stationery Office. pp. 7–694 – via Google Books.
- Chronological Table of and Index to the Statutes. Vol. 1: To the End of the Session 59 Vict. Sess. 2 (1895) (13th ed.). London: Her Majesty's Stationery Office. 1896. pp. 174–178 – via Google Books.
- "Statutes of the United Kingdom of Great Britain and Ireland, 1803". Irish Statute Book. Office of the Attorney General, Government of Ireland.

== See also ==
- List of acts of the Parliament of the United Kingdom
