= Royal Irish Rifle Volunteers =

The Royal Irish Rifle Volunteers was a Volunteer Corps established in Dublin, Ireland in 1860, in response to the Volunteer Force movement in the United Kingdom. The establishment of the corps was largely instigated by Colonel Fitzstephen French, of Frenchpark, County Roscommon, an MP for that county. Proponents of the force saw it as a way of uniting Irishmen of differing religious and political backgrounds in the common defence of their country. French attempted, but failed, to introduce a bill, the Volunteer Corps (Ireland) Bill, which would legitimise the setting up of a Volunteer Corps in the country. The following year the organisation was renamed the Loyal Association for Irish Rifle Volunteers.

== Background ==
On 12 May 1859 the Secretary of State for War, Jonathan Peel had issued a circular letter to lieutenants of counties in England, Wales and Scotland, authorising the formation of volunteer rifle corps (VRC, a.k.a. corps of rifle volunteers and rifle volunteer corps), and of artillery corps in defended coastal towns. Volunteer corps were to be raised under the provisions of the Volunteer Act 1804 (44 Geo. 3. c. 54) However, despite the intercession of some Irish MPs, Ireland was omitted from this project. A Volunteer Corps manned and officered in the main by Irishmen, the Irish Rifle Volunteer Corps had been set up in London in 1859.

== Aftermath ==
To replace the 1804 legislation, the Volunteer Act 1863 (26 & 27 Vict. c. 65) was passed, which still omitted Ireland from the right to have its own Volunteer Force, which sounded the death-knell of an Irish Volunteer Corps.

In June 1879 the Chevalier O'Clery, MP for County Wexford, introduced a bill, the Irish Volunteer Bill, in the British Parliament, which had the intention of allowing an armed Volunteer Corps to be set up in the country. The leaders of the Irish Party were divided on the issue, and only a small number supported it. The Chief Secretary for Ireland opposed the bill. The bill was rejected in Parliament on 1 March 1880.
