= Commander-in-Chief of the Forces =

Professional head of the English and then British Army (1660–1904)

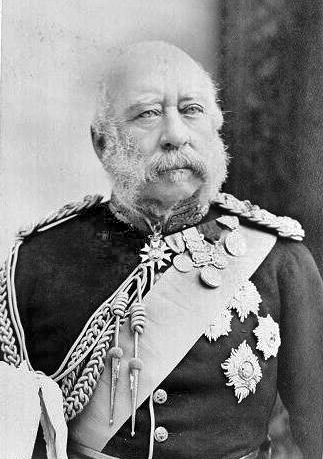
- Longest serving FM Prince George, Duke of Cambridge; 5 July 1856 – 1 November 1895
- English Army; British Army; War Office
- Type: Senior-most officer
- Abbreviation: C-in-C
- Reports to: Secretary of State for War
- Appointer: The Monarch
- Term length: No fixed term
- Formation: 1645; January 1793
- First holder: Captain General Sir Thomas Fairfax as General-in-Chief; FM Jeffery Amherst, 1st Lord Amherst as Commander-in-Chief of the Forces
- Final holder: FM Frederick Roberts, 1st Earl Roberts
- Abolished: 12 February 1904
- Succession: Chief of the General Staff

Commander-in-Chief of the Forces, later Commander-in-Chief, British Army, or just Commander-in-Chief (C-in-C), was (intermittently) the title of the professional head of the English Army from 1660 to 1707 (the English Army, founded in 1645, was succeeded in 1707 by the new British Army, incorporating existing Scottish regiments) and of the British Army from 1707 until 1904. The office was replaced in 1904 with the creation of the Army Council and the title of Chief of the General Staff.

== Republican origins ==
In earlier times, supreme command of the Army had been exercised by the monarch in person. In 1645, after the outbreak of the English Civil War, Parliament appointed Thomas Fairfax "Captain General and Commander-in-Chief of all the armies and forces raised and to be raised within the Commonwealth of England". Thomas Fairfax was the senior-most military officer, having no superior, and held great personal control over the army and its officers. Lord Fairfax was styled "Lord General". None of his successors would use this title. In 1650, Fairfax resigned his post, shortly before the Scottish campaign of the War.

Oliver Cromwell, Fairfax's Lieutenant-General, succeeded him as Commander-in-chief of the Forces. Under Cromwell, the Commander-in-Chief was de facto head of state, especially after the dismissal of the Long Parliament. Cromwell held the office until 1653, when he was elected Lord Protector.

On 21 February 1660, the reconstituted Long Parliament resolved "that General George Monck be constituted and appointed Captain-General and Commander in Chief, under Parliament, of all the Land-Forces of England, Scotland and Ireland".

== Post-Restoration history ==
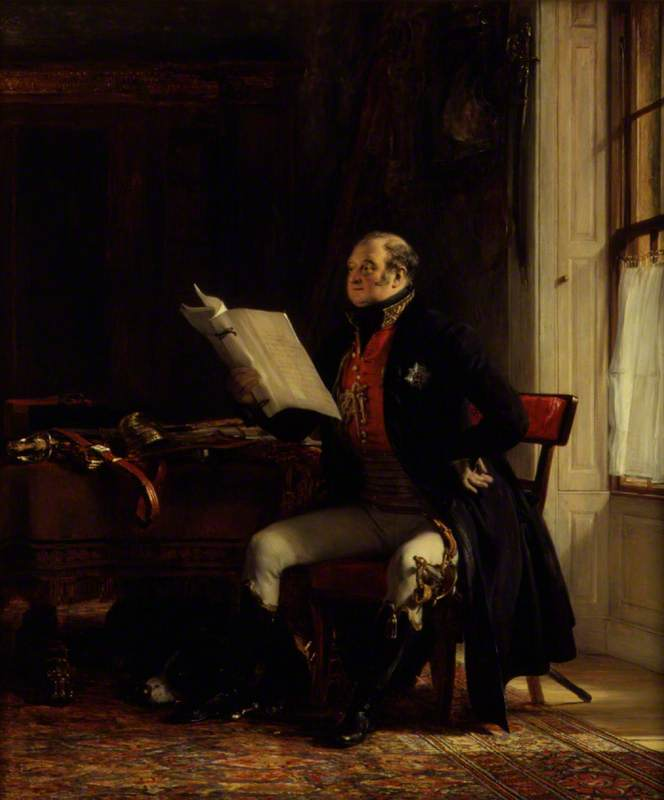
Portrait of Frederick, Duke of York by David Wilkie, 1823. York held the post during the Napoleonic Wars

After Monck's death, the post, which gave the holder significant military power, was abolished until James Scott, 1st Duke of Monmouth successfully petitioned Charles II and was granted it in 1674. After Monmouth's execution the post was again not filled until 1690, when it was bestowed upon John Churchill, Duke of Marlborough, during the King's absence in Ireland. It was likewise conferred on Meinhardt Schomberg, Duke of Schomberg the following year during the King's absence in Flanders, Marlborough having fallen from favour.

After 1660 it became rare for British sovereigns to lead their troops in battle (with the notable exception of King William III); instead, it became normative for command (especially in time of war) to be delegated to an individual, who usually held the appointment of Captain General or Commander-in-Chief of the Forces. (In early years these two titles were often used interchangeably, and/or the appointments were held concurrently). The office was not always filled: for example, James II and William III both functioned themselves as Commander-in-Chief; at other times the appointment simply lapsed (especially if there was no perceived immediate military threat).

With the appointment of General Lord Amherst in 1793, the Commander-in-Chief was given authority over matters of discipline, over supplies, training and promotions in the British Army. The establishment of a military staff took place under the oversight of his successor, Frederick, Duke of York.

In most instances, Commanders-in-Chief of the Forces were not Cabinet members (only Conway and Wellington had a seat in Cabinet by virtue of holding this office; Ligonier and Granby were also in Cabinet during their time in office, but in both cases sat as Master-General of the Ordnance). Instead, the British Army was represented variously and tenuously in government by the Paymaster of the Forces (Paymaster General from 1836), the Master-General of the Ordnance (who did not invariably have a seat in Cabinet), the Secretary at War (who was not usually a member of the Cabinet) and (from 1794) the Secretary of State for War.

With the demise of the Board of Ordnance in the wake of the Crimean War the Commander-in-Chief assumed command of the Ordnance troops: the Royal Regiment of Artillery and the Corps of Royal Engineers. The momentum of reform at this time, however, was toward increasing the authority of the Secretary of State for War. From the passing of the War Office Act 1870, as part of the Cardwell Reforms, the Commander-in-Chief was made clearly subordinate to the Secretary of State, to serve as the latter's principal military adviser, and was made to move out of his traditional office above the arch at Horse Guards and into the War Office. Nevertheless, in 1888 he is still described as having responsibility for all personnel and matériel issues for the army and auxiliary forces, and in 1895 he took on the responsibilities of chief of staff.

The appointment of Commander-in-Chief remained in the personal gift of the monarch, and its independence was guarded by Queen Victoria (among others) as emblematic of the notion that command of the Army was vested in the Crown; during her reign, however, the office was (in 1870) made much more clearly subordinate to the Secretary of State for War (and to Parliament).

Following the recommendations of the Esher Report, the office was replaced in 1904 with the creation of the Army Council and the appointment of Chief of the General Staff. The title reverted to the monarch, who remains (titular) "Commander-in-chief of the British Armed Forces".

Professional heads of the English/British Armed Forces
	Royal Navy	British Army	Royal Air Force	Combined
1645	N/A	Commander-in-Chief of the Forces (1645/60–1904, intermittently)	Not established	
1689	Senior Naval Lord (1689–1771)	Commander-in-Chief of the Forces (1645/60–1904, intermittently)	Not established	
1771	First Naval Lord (1771–1904)	Commander-in-Chief of the Forces (1645/60–1904, intermittently)	Not established	
1904	First Sea Lord (1904–1917)	Chief of the General Staff (1904–1909)	Not established	Inter-service co-ordination was carried out from 1904 by the Committee of Imperial Defence under the chairmanship of the Prime Minister
1909	First Sea Lord (1904–1917)	Chief of the Imperial General Staff (1909–1964)	Not established	Inter-service co-ordination was carried out from 1904 by the Committee of Imperial Defence under the chairmanship of the Prime Minister
1917	First Sea Lord and Chief of the Naval Staff (1917–present)	Chief of the Imperial General Staff (1909–1964)	Not established	Inter-service co-ordination was carried out from 1904 by the Committee of Imperial Defence under the chairmanship of the Prime Minister
1918	First Sea Lord and Chief of the Naval Staff (1917–present)	Chief of the Imperial General Staff (1909–1964)	Chief of the Air Staff (1918–present)	Inter-service co-ordination was carried out from 1904 by the Committee of Imperial Defence under the chairmanship of the Prime Minister
1923	First Sea Lord and Chief of the Naval Staff (1917–present)	Chief of the Imperial General Staff (1909–1964)	Chief of the Air Staff (1918–present)	Chairman of the Chiefs of Staff Committee (1923–1959, held by one of the service heads until 1956)
1959	First Sea Lord and Chief of the Naval Staff (1917–present)	Chief of the Imperial General Staff (1909–1964)	Chief of the Air Staff (1918–present)	Chief of the Defence Staff (1959–present)
1964	First Sea Lord and Chief of the Naval Staff (1917–present)	Chief of the General Staff (1964–present)	Chief of the Air Staff (1918–present)	Chief of the Defence Staff (1959–present)

== The Forces ==
The British military (ie., that part of the armed forces committed to land warfare, and not to be confused with the naval forces) was originally made up of several forces, including the British Army, the others being: the Ordnance Military Corps of the Board of Ordnance (including the Royal Artillery, Royal Engineers, and Royal Sappers and Miners), being a professional, or regular force like the army); the Militia Force (or Constitutional Force), being a conscripted reserve infantry force able to be called out in times of emergency for home defence; the Yeomanry, being a similar mounted force; and the Volunteer Corps, made up of voluntary reserve units that normally only existed during wartime. The Board of Ordnance was abolished in 1855 and its military corps, commissariat stores, transport, barracks and other departments were absorbed into the British Army, which was also called Regular Force or Regular Army). The Reserve Forces were also known as the Auxiliary Forces and the Local Forces (as their personnel could not originally be compelled to serve outside their local areas), and were re-organised in the 1850s with the Militia becoming voluntary (but with recruits engaging for a period of service that they were obliged to complete), and the Volunteer Force permanently established. These forces were increasingly integrated with the British Army during the final decades of the Nineteenth Century and the first decades of the Twentieth Century. The Yeomanry and Volunteer Force became the Territorial Force in 1908, and the Militia became the Special Reserve (and ceased to exist after the First World War).

== Appointees ==
The following table lists all those who have held the post of Commander-in-Chief of the Forces or its preceding positions. Ranks and honours are as at the completion of their tenure:
† denotes people who died in office.

No.	Portrait	Name	Took office	Left office	Time in office	Ref.
Parliamentary General-in-Chief Command
1	Sir Thomas Fairfax	Captain General; Sir Thomas Fairfax (1612–1671)	1645	1650	4–5 years	
2	Oliver Cromwell	Captain General; Oliver Cromwell (1599–1658)	1650	1653	2–3 years	
General-in-Chief Command
1	George Monck, 1st Duke of Albemarle	Captain General; George Monck, 1st Duke of Albemarle (1608–1670)	3 August 1660	3 January 1670 †	9 years, 153 days	
Position vacant (3 January 1670 – 30 March 1674)
2	James Scott, 1st Duke of Monmouth	General; James Scott, 1st Duke of Monmouth (1649–1685)	30 March 1674	1 December 1679	5 years, 246 days	
Position vacant (1 December 1679 – 3 June 1690)
3	John Churchill, 1st Earl of Marlborough	General; John Churchill, 1st Earl of Marlborough (1650–1722)	3 June 1690	30 April 1691	331 days	
4	Meinhardt Schomberg, 3rd Duke of Schomberg	General; Meinhardt Schomberg, 3rd Duke of Schomberg (1641–1719)	30 April 1691	1691	0 years	
Position vacant (1691 – 24 April 1702)
(3)	John Churchill, 1st Earl of Marlborough	General; John Churchill, 1st Earl of Marlborough (1650–1722)	24 April 1702	1711	8–9 years	
5	James Butler, 2nd Duke of Ormonde	General; James Butler, 2nd Duke of Ormonde (1665–1745)	1 January 1711	1714	2–3 years	
(3)	John Churchill, 1st Earl of Marlborough	General; John Churchill, 1st Earl of Marlborough (1650–1722)	1714	1722	7–8 years	
Position vacant (1714 – 1 January 1744)
6	John Dalrymple, 2nd Earl of Stair	Field Marshal; John Dalrymple, 2nd Earl of Stair (1673–1747)	1 January 1744	1744	0 years	
7	George Wade	Field Marshal; George Wade (1673–1748)	1744	1745	0–1 years	
Position vacant (1745 – 1745)
8	Prince William, Duke of Cumberland	General; Prince William, Duke of Cumberland (1721–1765)	1745	24 October 1757	11–12 years	
9	John Ligonier, 1st Earl Ligonier	Field Marshal; John Ligonier, 1st Earl Ligonier (1680–1770)	24 October 1757	1766	8–9 years	
10	John Manners, Marquess of Granby	Lieutenant-General; John Manners, Marquess of Granby (1721–1770)	13 August 1766	17 January 1770	3 years, 157 days	
Position vacant (17 January 1770 – 19 March 1778)
11	Jeffery Amherst, 1st Baron Amherst	Field Marshal; Jeffery Amherst, 1st Baron Amherst (1717–1797)	19 March 1778	29 March 1782	4 years, 10 days	
12	Henry Seymour Conway	Field Marshal; Henry Seymour Conway (1721–1795)	29 March 1782	21 January 1793	10 years, 298 days	
Commander-in-Chief
1	Jeffery Amherst, 1st Lord Amherst	Field Marshal; Jeffery Amherst, 1st Lord Amherst (1717–1797)	January 1793	February 1795	2 years, 31 days	
2	Prince Frederick, Duke of York	Field Marshal; Prince Frederick, Duke of York (1763–1827)	3 April 1795	25 March 1809	13 years, 356 days	
3	Sir David Dundas	General; Sir David Dundas (1735–1820)	18 March 1809	26 May 1811	2 years, 69 days	
(2)	Prince Frederick, Duke of York	Field Marshal; Prince Frederick, Duke of York (1763–1827)	29 May 1811	5 January 1827 †	15 years, 221 days	
4	Arthur Wellesley, 1st Duke of Wellington	Field Marshal; Arthur Wellesley, 1st Duke of Wellington (1769–1852)	22 January 1827	22 January 1828	1 year	
5	Rowland Hill, 1st Lord Hill	General; Rowland Hill, 1st Lord Hill (1772–1842)	22 January 1828	15 August 1842	14 years, 205 days	
(4)	Arthur Wellesley, 1st Duke of Wellington	Field Marshal; Arthur Wellesley, 1st Duke of Wellington (1769–1852)	15 August 1842	14 September 1852 †	10 years, 30 days	
6	Henry Hardinge, 1st Viscount Hardinge	Field Marshal; Henry Hardinge, 1st Viscount Hardinge (1785–1856)	28 September 1852	5 July 1856	3 years, 281 days	
7	Prince George, Duke of Cambridge	Field Marshal; Prince George, Duke of Cambridge (1819–1904)	5 July 1856	1 November 1895	39 years, 119 days	
8	Garnet Wolseley, 1st Viscount Wolseley	Field Marshal; Garnet Wolseley, 1st Viscount Wolseley (1833–1913)	1 November 1895	3 January 1901	5 years, 63 days	
9	Frederick Roberts, 1st Earl Roberts	Field Marshal; Frederick Roberts, 1st Earl Roberts (1832–1914)	3 January 1901	12 February 1904	3 years, 40 days	

== Sources ==
- Gaunt, Peter (1996), Oliver Cromwell, Blackwell, ISBN 0-631-18356-6
- Glover, Richard (1963). Peninsular Preparation: The Reform of the British Army 1795–1809. Cambridge University Press.
- Heathcote, Tony (1999). The British Field Marshals 1736–1997. Pen & Sword Books Ltd. ISBN 0-85052-696-5.
