= Yeomanry and Volunteers Act 1802 =

Act of the Parliament of the United Kingdom

- Act of Parliament
- Parliament of the United Kingdom
- Long title: An act to enable his Majesty to avail himself of the Offers of certain Yeomanry and Volunteer Corps to continue their Services.
- Citation: 42 Geo. 3. c. 66
- Territorial extent: England and Wales; Scotland; (Note: Section 2.)

Dates
- Royal assent: 22 June 1802
- Commencement: 22 June 1802 (Note: The Acts of Parliament (Commencement) Act 1793.)
- Repealed: 6 August 1861

Other legislation
- Amended by: Volunteers and Yeomanry (Great Britain) Act 1803; Yeomanry Act 1804
- Repealed by: Statute Law Revision Act 1861
- Relates to: Yeomanry (Ireland) Act 1802

Status: Repealed

Text of statute as originally enacted

The Yeomanry and Volunteers Act 1802 (42 Geo. 3. c. 66) was an act of the Parliament of the United Kingdom affecting the Yeomanry and Volunteers, two of the military Reserve Forces raised in the United Kingdom for home defence. Following the creation of the British Army Regular Reserve in 1859, by the then Secretary of State for War, Sidney Herbert, and re-organised under the Reserve Force Act 1867, were increasingly referred to instead as the Auxiliary Forces or the Local Forces to prevent confusion. It only covered units in England, Wales, and Scotland, with Irish units provided for by the Yeomanry (Ireland) Act 1802 (42 Geo. 3. c. 68).

The various units of Yeomanry and Volunteers had been raised during the French Revolutionary Wars, but were only meant to serve during wartime. With the Treaty of Amiens in March 1802, the legal basis for maintaining these forces had disappeared. The Act allowed these corps to continue in service during peacetime on a voluntary basis.

The act exempted members of these units from the militia ballot, in return for attending a minimum of five days exercise per year, and from various small taxes such as the duty on horses for men of the Yeomanry. When called into active service outside their county, they received standard Army pay but were subject to military regulations, and men disabled on active service were eligible for half-pay or Chelsea pensions.

== Subsequent developments ==
So much of the act as related to corps of yeomanry and volunteers in Great Britain was repealed by section 1 of the Yeomanry Act 1804] (44 Geo. 3. c. 54). which came into force on 5 June 1804.

The whole act was repealed by section 1 of, and the schedule to, the Statute Law Revision Act 1861 (24 & 25 Vict. c. 101), which came into force on 6 August 1861.
