= Yeomanry (Ireland) Act 1802 =

Act of the Parliament of the United Kingdom

Yeomanry (Ireland) Act 1802 (Note: The citation of this act by this short title was authorised by section 1 of, and the first schedule to, the Short Titles Act 1896. Due to the repeal of those provisions it is now authorised by section 19(2) of the Interpretation Act 1978.)
- Act of Parliament
- Parliament of the United Kingdom
- Long title: An act to enable his Majesty to accept and continue the Services of certain Troops or Companies of Yeomanry in Ireland.
- Citation: 42 Geo. 3. c. 68
- Territorial extent: Ireland (Note: Section 1.)

Dates
- Royal assent: 22 June 1802
- Commencement: 22 June 1802 (Note: The Acts of Parliament (Commencement) Act 1793.)
- Repealed: 1 October 1921
Other legislation
Amended by	Statute Law Revision Act 1872; Regulation of the Forces Act 1881; Statute Law Revision Act 1888
Repealed by	Territorial Army and Militia Act 1921
Relates to	Yeomanry and Volunteers Act 1802

Status: Repealed

Text of statute as originally enacted

The Yeomanry (Ireland) Act 1802 (42 Geo. 3. c. 68) was an act of the Parliament of the United Kingdom affecting the Yeomanry and Volunteers, two of the forces raised in the United Kingdom for home defence. It only covered units in Ireland, with those in England, Wales, and Scotland provided for by the Yeomanry and Volunteers Act 1802 (c. 66).

The various units of Yeomanry and Volunteers had been raised during the French Revolutionary Wars, but were only meant to serve during wartime. With the Treaty of Amiens in March 1802, the legal basis for maintaining these forces had disappeared. The Act allowed these corps to continue in service during peacetime on a voluntary basis.

The act provided that when units were on exercise (up to two days per month), the Government would provide pay, clothing, and weapons, and each troop was allowed one permanent paid sergeant. However, unlike the English act, the units would not be subject to military duty or discipline. As the militia ballot was hardly ever used in Ireland, the act did not provide any formal exemption for volunteers.

== Subsequent developments ==
Section 13 of the act was repealed by section 1 of, and the schedule to, the Statute Law Revision Act 1872 (35 & 36 Vict. c. 63), which came into force on 6 August 1872.

The whole act was repealed by section 4 of, and the second schedule to, the Territorial Army and Militia Act 1921 (11 & 12 Geo. 5. c. 37), which came into force on 1 October 1921.
