= Yeomanry Act 1804 =

Act of the Parliament of the United Kingdom

Yeomanry Act 1804 (Note: The citation of this act by this short title was authorised by section 1 of, and the first schedule to, the Short Titles Act 1896. Due to the repeal of those provisions it is now authorised by section 19(2) of the Interpretation Act 1978.)
- Act of Parliament
- Parliament of the United Kingdom
- Long title: An act to consolidate and amend the provisions of the several acts relating to corps of yeomanry and volunteers in Great Britain; and to make further regulations relating thereto.
- Citation: 44 Geo. 3. c. 54
- Territorial extent: England and Wales; Scotland; (Note: Preamble.)

Dates
- Royal assent: 5 June 1804
- Commencement: 5 June 1804 (Note: The Acts of Parliament (Commencement) Act 1793.)
- Repealed: 1 October 1921

Other legislation
- Amends: See § Repealed enactments
- Repeals/revokes: See § Repealed enactments
- Amended by: Yeomanry (Accounts) Act 1804; Volunteer Act 1863; Statute Law Revision Act 1872; Regulation of the Forces Act 1881
- Repealed by: Territorial Army and Militia Act 1921

Status: Repealed

Text of statute as originally enacted

The Yeomanry Act 1804 (44 Geo. 3. c. 54) was an act of the Parliament of the United Kingdom that consolidated enactments relating to the yeomanry and volunteer corps of Great Britain.

== Background ==
In the two years following the resumption of war with France in 1803, twenty-one separate acts were passed to raise forces, either voluntarily or by compulsion, for the defence of the realm. Among these were the Yeomanry and Volunteers Act 1802 (42 Geo. 3. c. 66) and the Yeomanry and Volunteer Cavalry Act 1803 (43 Geo. 3. c. 121), together with a further act, passed earlier in the same 1804 session, to explain and amend those two acts. The resulting body of law governing corps of yeomanry and volunteers in Great Britain had become confused, and the Yeomanry Act 1804 consolidated it into a single act. With only minor subsequent amendment, it effectively governed the yeomanry until the Militia and Yeomanry Act 1901 (1 Edw. 7. c. 14). The act was itself amended less than two months later by the Yeomanry (Accounts) Act 1804 (44 Geo. 3. c. 94), so far as it related to the accounting for money received by volunteer officers.

== Provisions ==
Section 1 repealed so much of the recited acts as related to corps of yeomanry and volunteers in Great Britain. Section 2 preserved any exemption from serving or being balloted to serve in the militia, or from duties chargeable on horses, to which a person was already entitled under the repealed acts, until the time fixed by the new act for making the first return after its passing. Section 3 empowered the King to disband or discontinue the services of any corps of yeomanry or volunteers, while providing that the services of corps already accepted before the passing of the act should be treated as continued unless he signified his intention to disband or discontinue them. Section 4 exempted every person enrolled and serving as an effective member of a corps of yeomanry or volunteers from being liable to serve personally, or to provide a substitute, in the militia of Great Britain or in any additional force raised for the defence of the realm.

=== Repealed enactments ===
Section 1 of the act repealed 3 enactments, listed in that section. The repeal did not affect the demanding, recovering, or levying of any fine or penalty incurred before the passing of the act.

Citation	Short title	Description	Extent of repeal
42 Geo. 3. c. 66	Yeomanry and Volunteers Act 1802	An act to enable his Majesty to avail himself of the offers of certain yeomanry and volunteer corps to continue their services.	So much of the act as related to corps of yeomanry and volunteers in Great Britain.
43 Geo. 3. c. 121	Yeomanry and Volunteer Cavalry Act 1803	An act for authorising the billeting of such troops of yeomanry and volunteer cavalry as may be desirous of assembling for the purpose of being trained together, in Great Britain and Ireland; and for subjecting to military discipline, during the war, such serjeants serving in any volunteer or yeomanry corps of cavalry or infantry as receive constant pay, and all trumpeters, drummers, or buglemen serving therein, and receiving pay at any daily or weekly rate; and for the further regulation of such yeomanry and volunteer corps.	So much of the act as related to corps of yeomanry and volunteers in Great Britain.
44 Geo. 3. c. 18	Volunteers and Yeomanry (Great Britain) Act 1803	An act to explain and amend two acts, passed in the forty-second and forty-third years of the reign of his present Majesty, relating to volunteers and yeomanry corps in Great Britain.	So much of the act as related to corps of yeomanry and volunteers in Great Britain.

== Subsequent developments ==
The whole act was repealed by section 4 of, and the second schedule to, the Territorial Army and Militia Act 1921 (11 & 12 Geo. 5. c. 37), which came into force on 1 October 1921.

== Bibliography ==
- Beckett, Ian Frederick William (2011). Britain's Part-Time Soldiers: The Amateur Military Tradition: 1558–1945. Barnsley, South Yorkshire: Pen & Sword Military. ISBN 978-1848843950.
