= Cardwell Reforms =

Reforms of the British Army

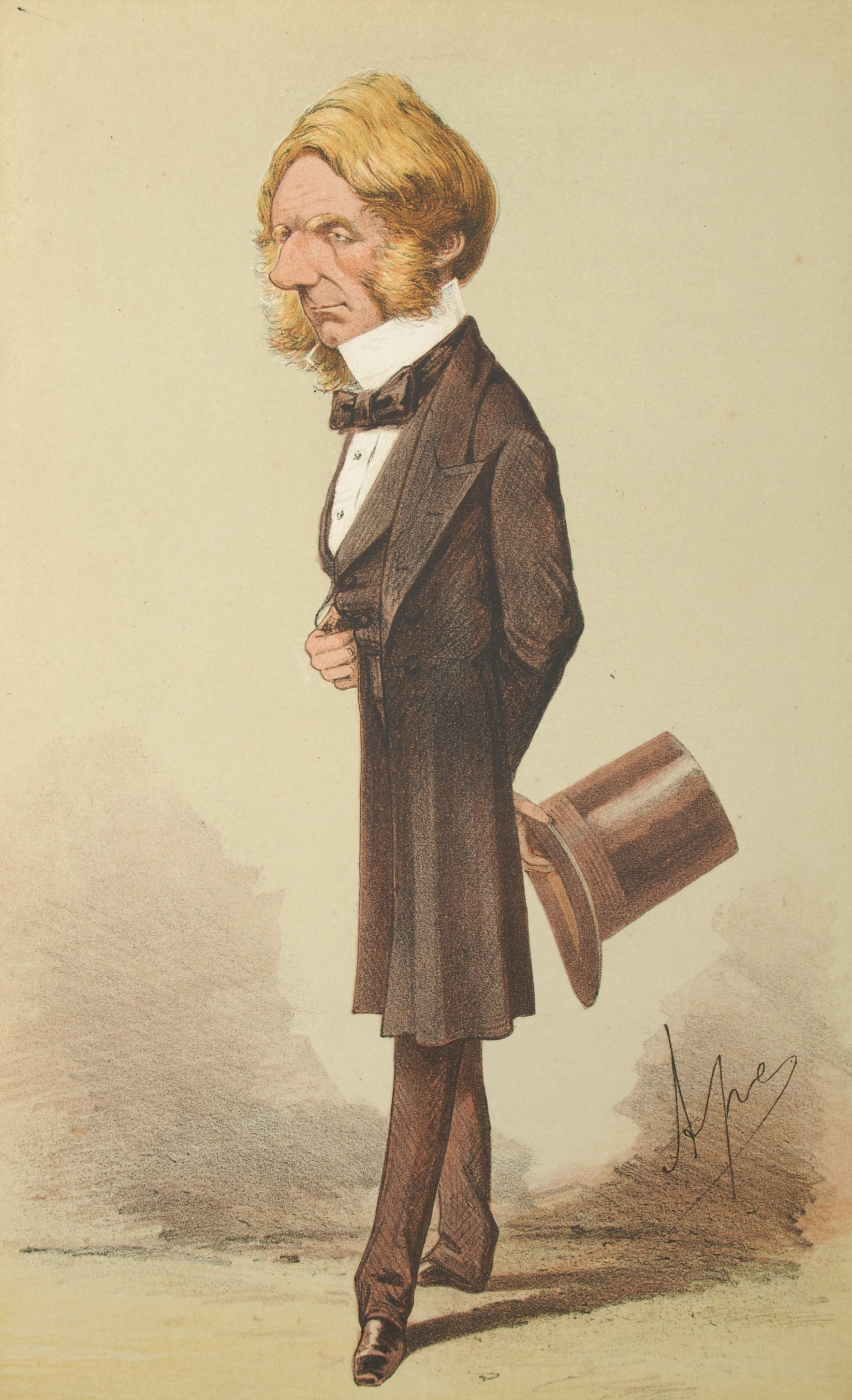
Edward Cardwell, depicted in an 1869 caricature by Carlo "Ape" Pellegrini

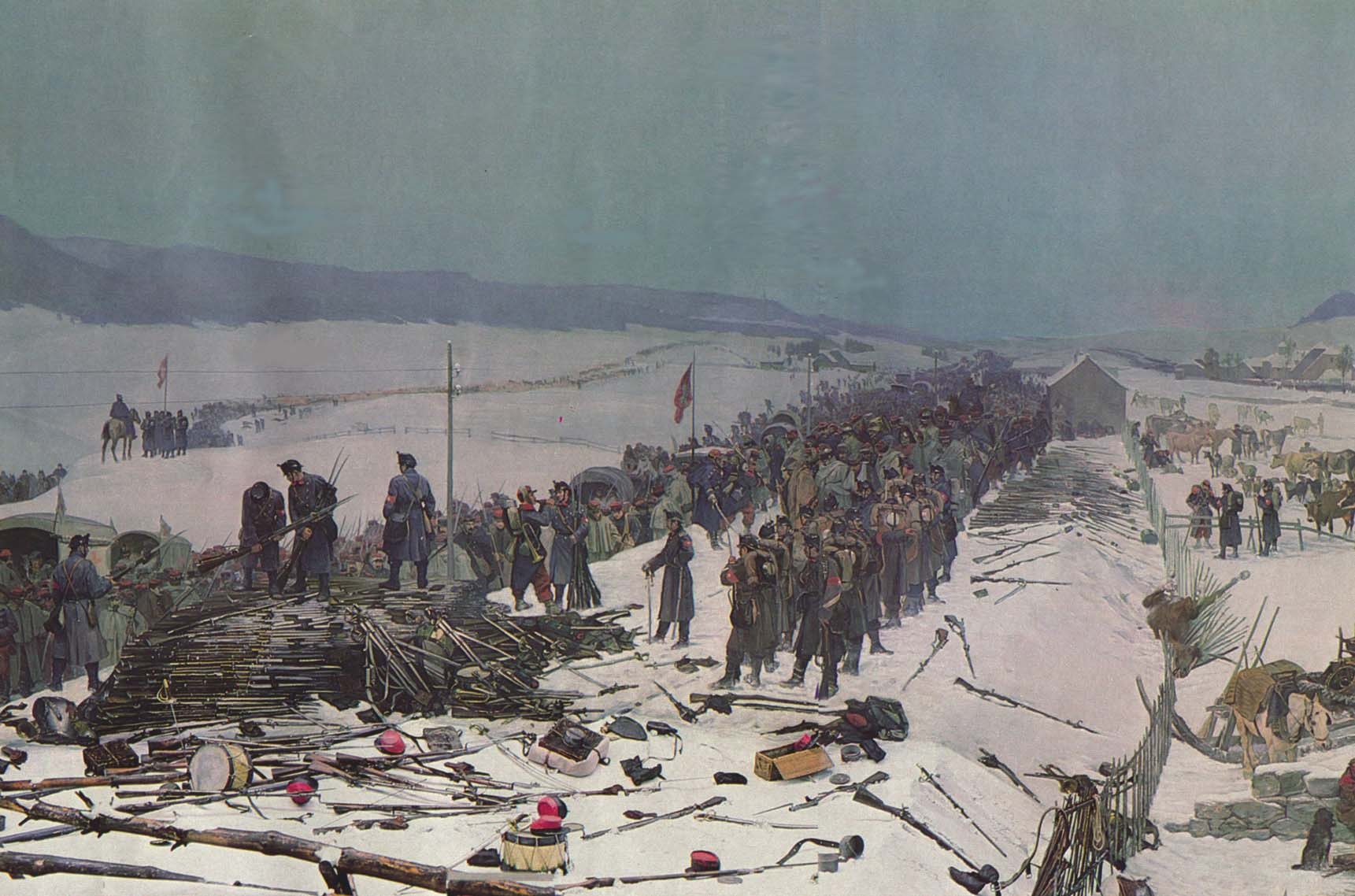
The French Army of the East is disarmed after their disastrous defeat by Prussia in 1871; this war showed the need of the British armed forces to modernise.

The Cardwell Reforms were a series of reforms of the British Army undertaken by Secretary of State for War Edward Cardwell between 1868 and 1874 with the support of Liberal prime minister William Ewart Gladstone. Gladstone paid little attention to military affairs but he was keen on efficiency. In 1870, he pushed through Parliament major changes in Army organisation. The German Empire's stunning triumph over the Second French Empire in the Franco-Prussian War proved that the Prussian system of professional soldiers with up-to-date weapons was far superior to the traditional system of gentlemen-soldiers that Britain used.

The reforms were not radical; they had been brewing for years and Gladstone seized the moment to enact them. The goal was to centralise the power of the War Office, abolish the purchase of officers' commissions, and create reserve forces stationed in Britain by establishing short terms of service for enlisted men. Ending the purchase system was controversial. The families of officers had invested millions of pounds in the commissions and when a man was promoted he sold his junior commission to help pay for the more expensive senior commission. Legislation in the Commons would reimburse the officers for their full purchase price but the measure was defeated, whereupon the government announced that all purchases were abolished, thereby destroying the value of those commissions. The House of Lords passed the remedial legislation and the final expenditure made by officers was reimbursed.

== Background ==
Five royal commissions dealt with Army reforms before 1870. The one in 1857 was most controversial, with Sir Charles Trevelyan campaigning for the abolition of purchase of commissions. The going rate was £2,400 for a captaincy and £7,000 for promotion to Lieutenant Colonel. The middle class ideal of selection by merit and education was found only in the artillery and engineers, with the other branches in the hands of the rich landed gentry. The pool was limited so that the provision of an army of only 25,000 in the Crimea had stripped Britain of almost every trained soldier. The lesson was reinforced by the Indian Mutiny, which once again required almost the entire usable British Army to suppress. The commission reported in 1862, but few of its lessons were immediately implemented. The main obstacle had been objections by the defunct East India Company and its directors, who wished to maintain their own military establishment, and by the "die-hards", senior officers who opposed almost any reform on principle. The arch-conservatives among the Army's officers were led by the Commander-in-Chief of the Forces, Prince George, Duke of Cambridge, who was Queen Victoria's cousin, and, in the opinion of historian William McElwee:

... almost the last of the typically Hanoverian characters thrown up by the English ruling dynasty, and derived his ideas on drill and discipline from Butcher Cumberland and the Prussian school of Frederick the Great.

On 2 August 1870, Parliament voted for 20,000 additional men for the army and two million pounds on a vote of credit. This was followed by one of the most successful military pamphlets to appear in all Victorian England, titled The Battle of Dorking. Written by Colonel (later General) Sir George Tomkyns Chesney, head of the Indian Civil Engineering College, it raised the idea that, despite the acts of Parliament during the previous year in regard to the military, Britain faced the possibility of a German invasion.

Cardwell, protégé of Gladstone and Secretary of State for War since 1868, was determined not merely to increase the British military but to reform it as well. Both were to be an uphill battle, but the need was great. Even the hard lessons of the Crimea had been dismissed, ignored or forgotten by this time, leaving critical needs unmet.

As R. C. K. Ensor wrote about that era:

If ... [any] criticism had made headway, it was that England had no notion of the art of war. British officers were expected to be gentlemen and sportsmen; but outside the barrack-yard they were ... 'entirely wanting in military knowledge'. The lack of it was deemed no drawback, since Marlborough's and Wellington's officers got along without it. Only the rise of the Prussian military ... availed to shake this complacency."

== First reforms ==
Cardwell set about with three initial reforms:

- In 1868, he abolished flogging and other harsh disciplinary measures in the Army during peacetime. This action was opposed by nearly every senior officer, who used the opinions of the Duke of Wellington to validate their objections. Yet, it was imperative to attract good quality recruits by ensuring the private soldier's life was better than a kind of penal servitude. Flogging was retained as a punishment on active service, on the pretext that extraordinary powers of punishment might be required in the field, until finally abolished in 1881.
- In 1869, troops were withdrawn from self-governing colonies, which were encouraged to raise their own local forces. This scattering of troops over far-flung colonies was likewise a Wellingtonian policy. Its initial motives had been to avoid the traditional British suspicion of a standing army (led by the Whigs). The policy was a failure on economic practicality, and also prevented training at any level above that of battalion. By 1871, 26,000 British troops had been withdrawn from overseas territories and returned to Great Britain.
- 1870 saw the abolition of bounty money for recruits, and the setting out of guidelines for the swift discharge of known bad characters from both the army and the navy.

== Army Enlistment Act 1870 ==
Army Enlistment Act 1870 (Note: Section 1.)
- Act of Parliament
- Parliament of the United Kingdom
- Long title: An Act to shorten the time of Active Service in the Army, and to amend in certain respects the Law of Enlistment.
- Citation: 33 & 34 Vict. c. 67
- Territorial extent: United Kingdom

Dates
- Royal assent: 9 August 1870
- Commencement: 9 August 1870 (Note: Section 2.)
- Repealed: 1 October 1921
Other legislation
Amends	Reserve Force Act 1867
Amended by	Regulation of the Forces Act 1881; Reserve Forces Act 1882; Militia Act 1882
Repealed by	Territorial Army and Militia Act 1921

Status: Repealed

Text of statute as originally enacted

As his first major legislative step towards military reform, Cardwell introduced the Army Enlistment Act 1870 (33 & 34 Vict. c. 67), also known as the Army Enlistment (Short Service) Act 1870 or the Reserve Forces Act 1870, which reached the floor of the House of Commons in late spring, 1870.

From the end of the Napoleonic Wars until 1847, men were enlisted for twenty-one years, practically for life (the seven year short service option available during the wars ended when the wars did). Together with the continued existence of flogging, it had given the army its character of a near prison. A shortfall in Army numbers had resulted in the Time of Service in the Army Act 1847, under which enlistment was for ten years, later increased to twelve; but this was still too long. On completion of their enlistment, soldiers had the choice between accepting discharge without pension or signing on for a further ten- or twelve-year term. If they chose the latter, they would be rewarded with two months furlough, another enlistment bounty, and a pension on completion of their term. After many years with no trade other than that of soldiering, more than half of all discharged soldiers chose to re-enlist immediately. Of those who took a voluntary discharge, fully one in five signed on again within six months.

The Army's existing system of enlistment therefore produced an army of experienced or even veteran soldiers, but no class of reserves that could be recalled to serve in case of a national emergency. The lesson of the Franco-Prussian War was the absolute necessity of a trustworthy army reserve of well trained men in good health and vigour. Almost every British soldier served more than half his enlistment abroad, most often in tropical climates, such as India. After returning to Britain, their physique was seldom good.

Under the Reserve Force Act 1867 (30 & 31 Vict. c. 110), a "First Class Army Reserve" had been created, of soldiers released from active service who had not completed their terms of service, to have an establishment of 20,000 men in theory. In practice, as of 1868, only 2,033 were in this body of men. The "Second Class Army Reserve" was to consist of army pensioners and of discharged soldiers having at least five years regular service. The First Class Army Reserve was liable for overseas service in the event of war, whereas the Second Class Army Reserve was for home service to defend against invasion.

Cardwell therefore brought before Parliament the idea of "short service". The Army Enlistment Act 1870 allowed a soldier to choose to spend time in the reserves rather than the regulars and be paid fourpence a day, in return for a short period of training each year and an obligation to serve when called up. Men now enlisted for a maximum term of twelve years. The minimum length of actual service required varied according to branch: six years for infantry, eight years for line cavalry and artillery, twelve years for the Household Cavalry, three years for the Army Service Corps. On discharge, a soldier in any corps would now remain with the reserves for the remainder of his twelve-year term, under the umbrella of the First Class Army Reserve. (In subsequent years, soldiers entering the reserve to serve the remainder of their time would be classified as either Section A or Section B Army Reserve.) As to the proportion of time spent on active service with the colours versus the balance in the reserve, this was to be laid down from time to time by the Secretary of State for War. In 1881, short service for the infantry was increased to seven years with the colours, and five with the reserve, of the twelve-year enlistment period.

There was opposition to short-term enlistment both in Parliament and among the Army's senior officers. The Queen is said to have signed the act into law "most reluctantly", but the system worked, producing an immediate increase in the army's strength. While a number of long-service NCOs still chose to remain with the colours for the maximum service permitted of twenty-one years, the great majority of soldiers passed into the reserve at the end of their initial enlistments. By 1900 the reservists numbered about 80,000 trained men, still relatively young and available to be recalled to their units at short notice in the event of general mobilisation.

== Localisation scheme ==
Cardwell then passed the comprehensive Regulation of the Forces Act 1871. Previously, soldiers had enlisted for General Service, and were liable to be drafted into any regiment regardless of their own preferences, another factor that had made service harsh and unpopular. It had been recognised as early as 1829 by Lord Palmerston that:

... there is a great disinclination on the part of the lower orders to enlist for general service; they like to know that they are to be in a certain regiment, connected, perhaps, with their own county, and their own friends, and with officers who have established a connection with that district. There is a preference frequently on the part of the people for one regiment as opposed to another, and I should think there would be found a great disinclination in men to enlist for general service, and to be liable to be drafted and sent to any corps or station.

Nevertheless, the Army had insisted for years that it could be administered only on the basis of General Service.

Under Cardwell's localisation scheme, the country was divided into 66 brigade districts (later renamed regimental districts), based on county boundaries and population density. All line infantry regiments would now consist of two battalions, sharing a depot and associated recruiting area. One battalion would serve overseas, while the other was stationed at home for training. The militia of that area then (usually) became the third battalion. There were limitations to the extent that localisation could be implemented. Certain recruiting regions (for example London and much of Ireland) offered more recruits than could be absorbed by the linked regiment. Equally, thinly populated rural areas in some English counties or the Scottish Highlands could not always provide the numbers needed.

The senior twenty-five regiments of the line already consisted of two battalions, but almost all the higher-numbered regiments had only one battalion. Many regiments were linked to produce two-battalion regiments, a complicated internal process involving much debate over regimental traditions and seniority, which was not finally completed until the ensuing Childers Reforms of 1881.

== Other reforms ==
In addition to his two major pieces of legislation, Cardwell also introduced a number of reforms through Orders in Council or other statutory instruments.

- An order of 1871 abolished some little-used disciplinary practices such as branding.
- The sale of commissions was abolished, as were the subaltern ranks of cavalry Cornet and infantry Ensign, replaced with Second Lieutenant. (In practice, the style "Cornet" is still used for Second Lieutenants in the Blues and Royals and the Royal Hussars, and the term "Ensign" is still used by the Foot Guards regiments, for instance during the ceremony of Trooping the Colour.)
- Units were assigned to the same establishment whether serving at home (a definition which included not only the UK but also the Channel Islands, Gibraltar and Malta) or overseas. (To an extent, this was made possible by steamship transport and the Suez Canal.) Units serving overseas had previously had a larger authorised troop strength, to provide for losses to disease or climate, which would be difficult to replace, but this left the units at home chronically undermanned as they were stripped of soldiers to bring units departing overseas up to their authorised strength. With the separate establishments removed, the home units could now be used to form an effective expeditionary force.

By the War Office Act 1870 Cardwell also reformed the administration of the War Office, preventing infighting and bickering between the various departments and abolishing the separate administration of the Reserves and Volunteers. The defence policy of Canada, the Australian colonies and New Zealand was devolved to those colonies, and several small garrisons were replaced by units raised locally.

== Role of Garnet Wolseley ==
Then-Colonel (later Field Marshal Lord) Garnet Wolseley was appointed assistant adjutant-general at the War Office in 1871, and was regarded by Cardwell as his principal military adviser and protégé. He played a critical role in the Cardwell schemes of army reform. As he rose rapidly through the ranks, Wolseley continued to battle for what he saw as the main pillar of the reforms: providing a double framework for large scale expansion in war, namely regular reserves, generated by short service, together with revitalised militia integrated into the new geographic regimental structure.

Cardwell lobbied for him to command the Ashanti expedition in 1873. On his return he was appointed inspector-general of auxiliary forces in April 1874. In this role, he directed his efforts to building up adequate volunteer reserve forces. Finding himself opposed by the senior military, he wrote a strong memorandum and spoke of resigning when they tried to persuade him to withdraw it. He became a lifelong advocate of the volunteer reserves, later commenting that all military reforms since 1860 in the British Army had first been introduced by the volunteers. Long after Cardwell's departure, on his appointment back at the War Office as Quartermaster-General to the Forces in July 1880, he found that there was still great resistance to the short service system and used his growing public persona to return to the fight, including making a speech at a banquet in Mansion House in which he commented: '...how an Army raised under the long service system totally disappeared in a few months under the walls of Sevastopol'. The unexpectedly large force required for the initial phase of the Second Boer War in 1899 was mainly furnished by means of the system of reserves Cardwell had designed and Wolseley had built. By drawing on regular reservists and volunteer reserves, Britain was able to assemble the largest army it had ever deployed abroad.

== Evaluation ==
These reforms started to turn British forces into an effective Imperial force. A change of government put Cardwell out of office in 1874, but his reforms remained despite attempts from the Regular Army to abolish them and return to the comfortable and familiar old post-1815 situation.

The Reserve Force Act 1867 had failed to meet the aim of recruiting the numbers of reserves which were needed, so low a rate of pay having been offered for the First Class Army Reserve that very few joined it. To address this, their pay was doubled, subject to their accepting the new conditions of service contained in the Army Enlistment (Short Service) Act 1870. Unlike its predecessor, recruiting under this new act was very satisfactory and had the desired effect of filling up their numbers to the regulated strength.

Historians of the British army have generally praised the Cardwell reforms as essential to full modernisation. They point out that the Duke of Cambridge blocked many other reforms, such as the adoption of a general staff system as pioneered by the successful Prussian army.

However a minority of historians, chiefly political specialists, have criticised the limited nature of the reforms. Theodore Hoppen says these reforms were at best partial, at worst ineffective.... No planning department was established and no chief of staff appointed to set out the purpose and strategy of the army as a whole because politicians, Civil Servants, and soldiers all proved reluctant to take seriously the idea that Britain could ever again be involved in a large scale European war.

== See also ==
- List of Regiments of Foot
- List of British Army regiments (1881)
- First Gladstone Ministry
- Recruitment in the British Army

=== Further reforms of the British Army ===
- Childers Reforms of 1881
- Haldane Reforms of 1906–1912
