= Regulation of the Forces Act 1881 =

Act of the Parliament of the United Kingdom

Regulation of the Forces Act 1881 (Note: Section 1.)
- Act of Parliament
- Parliament of the United Kingdom
- Long title: An Act to amend the Law respecting the Regulation of Her Majesty's Forces, and to amend the Army Discipline and Regulation Act, 1879.
- Citation: 44 & 45 Vict. c. 57
- Territorial extent: United Kingdom; Channel Islands; Isle of Man

Dates
- Royal assent: 27 August 1881
- Commencement: 27 September 1881 (United Kingdom, Channel Islands and Isle of Man) (Note: Section 52(a).); 27 October 1881 (elsewhere in Europe, including Malta, and in the West Indies and America) (Note: Section 52(b).); 27 February 1882 (elsewhere, within or without Her Majesty's dominions) (Note: Section 52(c).)
- Repealed: 10 March 1966
Other legislation
Amends	Army Discipline and Regulation Act 1879; See § Repealed enactments
Repeals/revokes	See § Repealed enactments
Amended by	Army Act 1881
Repealed by	Statute Law Revision Act 1966

Status: Repealed

Text of statute as originally enacted

The Regulation of the Forces Act 1881 (44 & 45 Vict. c. 57) was an act of the Parliament of the United Kingdom that reorganised the law relating to the auxiliary and reserve land forces of the United Kingdom and made extensive amendments to the Army Discipline and Regulation Act 1879 (42 & 43 Vict. c. 33).

== Provisions ==
=== Repealed enactments ===
Section 54 of the act repealed 27 enactments, listed in the schedule to the act.

Citation	Short title	Description	Extent of repeal
42 Geo. 3. c. 68	Yeomanry (Ireland) Act 1802	An Act to enable His Majesty to accept and continue the services of certain troops or companies of yeomanry in Ireland.	Section seven.
43 Geo. 3. c. 61	Relief of Discharged Soldiers and Sailors Act 1803	An Act for the relief of soldiers, sailors, and marines, and the widows of soldiers in the cases therein mentioned so far as relates to England.	The whole act.
44 Geo. 3. c. 54	Yeomanry Act 1804	An Act to consolidate and amend the provisions of the several Acts relating to corps of yeomanry and volunteers in Great Britain, and to make further regulations relating thereto.	Section twenty-one, section twenty-five.
47 Geo. 3. Sess. 2. c. 25	Half-pay and Pensions Act 1807	An Act for the more convenient payment of half-pay and pensions, and other allowances to officers and widows of officers, and the persons upon the compassionate list.	The whole act except section four.
51 Geo. 3. c. 103	Retirement of Officers on Half Pay Act 1811	An Act to authorise the allowing officers to retire on half-pay or other allowances under certain restrictions.	So much as is unrepealed.
52 Geo. 3. c. 151	Retirement of Officers on Half Pay Act 1812	An Act to extend the provisions of an Act of the last session of Parliament relating to the half-pay and allowance of officers retiring from service, and to authorise the allowing to foreign officers wounded the like pensions and allowances as are given to British officers under the like circumstances.	The whole act.
50 Geo. 3. c. 87	Courts-Martial on Troops of East India Company Act 1810	An Act to amend two Acts relating to the raising men for the service of the East India Company, and the quartering and billeting such men, and to trials by regimental courts-martial.	So much as is unrepealed.
51 Geo. 3. c. 75	East India Company Act 1811	An Act for making further provision for the payment of salaries and other charges in the office of the Commissioners for the Affairs of India, and for enabling the East India Company to restore to the service of the said Company military officers removed therefrom by sentences of courts-martial, and to authorise the said Company, in cases of unforeseen urgency, to take up ships by private contract.	So much as is unrepealed.
58 Geo. 3. c. 73	Payment of Regimental Debts Act 1818	An Act for regulating the payment of regimental debts, and the distribution of the effects of officers and soldiers dying in service, and the receipt of sums due to officers.	So much as is unrepealed.
2 & 3 Will. 4. c. 106	Officers and Persons on the Compassionate List, etc. Act 1832	An Act to enable officers in His Majesty's army and their representatives, and the widows of officers and persons on the compassionate list, and also civil officers on retired or superannuation allowances payable by the Paymaster-General of His Majesty's forces, to draw for and receive their half-pay and allowances.	The whole act.
7 Will. 4 & 1 Vict. c. 29	Enlistment of Foreigners Act 1837	An Act for enabling Her Majesty to grant the rank of general officers to foreigners now bearing Her Majesty's commission, and to permit the enlistment of foreigners under certain restrictions.	So much as is unrepealed.
7 & 8 Vict. c. 18	Courts-martial in India Act 1844	An Act to remove doubts as to the power of appointing, convening, and confirming the sentences of courts-martial in the East Indies.	The whole act.
10 & 11 Vict. c. 37	Time of Service in the Army Act 1847	An Act for limiting the time of service in the army.	The whole act.
10 & 11 Vict. c. 63	Royal Marines Act 1847	An Act for limiting the time of service in the Royal Marine forces.	Section two; section three, from "to serve" to the end of the section; section four, from "according to the form" to the end of the section, and the schedules.
20 Vict. c. 1	Royal Marines Act 1857	An Act to amend the Act for limiting the time of service in the Royal Marine forces.	Section one, from "and the forms of questions" to the end of the section.
26 & 27 Vict. c. 65	Volunteer Act 1863	The Volunteer Act, 1863.	Section three, from "for the purposes of this Act" down to "usages of Her Majesty's forces," so far as relates to such portion of the permanent staff as are included in any corps of the regular forces within the meaning of this Act, and from "if any non-commissioned officer of the volunteer permanent staff" to the end of the section; section five, from "officers of the volunteer force when not on actual" down to "Articles of War;" section nine; section fourteen, from "for the purposes of this Act" down to "any regulations under this Act" so far as relates to such portion of the permanent staff as are included in any corps of the regular forces within the meaning of this Act; in section eighteen, the words "and to be billeted and quartered" and from "and to have relief" down to "or to Scotland;" sections twenty-two and twenty-three; section forty-nine, from "the term Mutiny Act" down to "Act for the time being in force," and from "if at any time Her Majesty thinks fit" down to "such men respectively," so far as relates to such portion of the permanent staff as are included in any corps of the regular forces within the meaning of this Act; and the forms of warrant (ii) and (iii) in the schedule.
30 & 31 Vict. c. 34	Army Enlistment Act 1867	An Act for limiting the period of enlistment in Her Majesty's army.	The whole act.
30 & 31 Vict. c. 110	Reserve Force Act 1867	The Reserve Force Act, 1867.	Sections four, six, seven, and eight; section ten from "and the said force" to the end of the section; section twelve; and section thirteen from "or who having" down to "service as aforesaid."
30 & 31 Vict. c. 111	Militia Reserve Act 1867	The Militia Reserve Act, 1867.	Section two, from "Mutiny Act means" to the end of the section; section six; section nine and section eleven from "may have volunteered" down to "enlisted under this Act;" and from "and offences committed by such men," to the end of the section.
33 & 34 Vict. c. 67	Army Enlistment Act 1870	The Army Enlistment Act, 1870.	The whole act except section fourteen, section fifteen down to "Reserve Act, 1867," section twenty, and section twenty-two.
34 & 35 Vict. c. 86	Regulation of the Forces Act 1871	The Regulation of the Forces Act, 1871.	Sections nine and fifteen.
38 & 39 Vict. c. 69	Militia Voluntary Enlistment Act 1875	The Militia Voluntary Enlistment Act, 1875.	Section two, from "Mutiny Act means" to "authority of the Mutiny Act;" section twenty; section twenty-two; section twenty-nine; section thirty-seven from "and officers either of the militia" to the end of the section; section forty-two; sections fifty-six to sixty; sections sixty-four to seventy-one; sections seventy-three to seventy-five; and section seventy-seven.
39 & 40 Vict. c. 36	Customs Consolidation Act 1876	The Customs Consolidation Act, 1876.	Section nine from "nor shall any soldiers" to the end of the section.
41 & 42 Vict. c. 10	Mutiny Act 1878	An Act for punishing mutiny and desertion and for the better payment of the army and their quarters.	The whole act except sections forty-two, forty-seven, and forty-eight, so far as they relate to the reserve forces and are not inconsistent with the Army Act, 1879, and except section forty-four from "Provided that a recruit" to the end of the section; sections fifty-seven, fifty-eight, eighty, one hundred and five, and one hundred and nine, and the first form of oath and the first form of certificate in the schedule, so far as they relate to any of the auxiliary forces and are not inconsistent with the Army Act, 1879.
41 & 42 Vict. c. 11	Marine Mutiny Act 1878	An Act for the Regulation of Her Majesty's Royal Marines while on shore.	The whole act.
42 & 43 Vict. c. 32	Army Discipline and Regulation (Commencement) Act 1879	The Army Discipline and Regulation (Commencement) Act, 1879.	Section four from "the expiration of the Army Mutiny Act shall not" down to "relating to the same matters."
42 & 43 Vict. c. 33	Army Discipline and Regulation Act 1879	The Army Discipline and Regulation Act, 1879.	Section twenty, from "or allows to escape" down to "keep or guard" (being sub-section two), section twenty-three, in section twenty-eight, the words "whether present as a witness or bystander, or in any capacity other than as a prisoner"; section forty-seven, from "such court-martial shall consist," down to "not less than three officers" (being sub-section (2)); section forty-eight, from "a general court-martial shall consist," down to "consist of three officers" (being sub-sections (3) and (4)); in section fifty-four, part of sub-section five, namely, "and where a court-martial is held in a colony" down to "above-mentioned" at the end of the sub-section; in sub-section (2) of section eighty-three the words "or while such soldier is on service beyond the seas" so far as they relate to men enlisted after the commencement of this Act; in section eighty-six, from "a soldier of the regular forces who is discharged" to the end of the section; in section one hundred and twenty, the words "by warrant of Her Majesty"; section one hundred and thirty-five; section one hundred and fifty-six from "a record made in one of the regimental books" down to "stated by such record" (being sub-section (g)); section one hundred and sixty-nine, from "Provided that it shall be the duty of the commanding officer," in sub-section (8) down to "in which he shall be subject to military law," being the end of that sub-section; section one hundred and seventy-one, from "and if any such officers or men of the royal marines," in sub-section (8) down to "subject to this Act accordingly," being the end of that sub-section; section one hundred and seventy-three, so far as relates to pensioners; in section one hundred and eighty-one, the definition of "corps" from "as respects cavalry" down to "included in a territorial brigade and" and from "a regiment of militia" to "volunteers and," and the last part of the section from "for the purpose of deducting" to the end of the section.

== Subsequent developments ==
The whole act was repealed by section 1 of, and the schedule to, the Statute Law Revision Act 1966, which came into force on 10 March 1966.
