= War Office Act 1870 =

Act of the Parliament of the United Kingdom

War Office Act 1870 (Note: Section 1.)
- Act of Parliament
- Parliament of the United Kingdom
- Long title: An Act for making further provision relating to the Management of certain Departments of the War Office.
- Citation: 33 & 34 Vict. c. 17
- Territorial extent: United Kingdom

Dates
- Royal assent: 20 June 1870
- Commencement: 20 June 1870 (Note: Section 2.)
- Repealed: 1 April 1964
Other legislation
Repealed by	Defence (Transfer of Functions) (No. 1) Order 1964

Status: Repealed

Text of statute as originally enacted

The War Office Act 1870(33 & 34 Vict. c. 17) was an act of the Parliament of the United Kingdom. One of the Cardwell Reforms, it was passed to allow the War Office to be reorganised. All of the various sections of the War Department were brought together in one building, and the Horse Guards were placed under the jurisdiction of the War Office.

The three departments the act created were the Commander-In-Chief, the Surveyor-General and the Financial Secretary.

== Subsequent developments ==
The whole act was repealed by section 2(2) of, and part II of the first schedule to, the Defence (Transfer of Functions) (No. 1) Order 1964 (SI 1964/488), which came into force on 1 April 1964.
