= Reserve Force Act 1867 =

Act of the Parliament of the United Kingdom

Reserve Force Act 1867 (Note: Section 1.)
- Act of Parliament
- Parliament of the United Kingdom
- Long title: An Act to consolidate and amend the Acts for rendering effective the Service of Chelsea and Naval Out-Pensioners and Pensioners of the East India Company, and for establishing a Reserve Force of Men who have been in Her Majesty's Service.
- Citation: 30 & 31 Vict. c. 110
- Territorial extent: United Kingdom

Dates
- Royal assent: 20 August 1867
- Commencement: 20 August 1867 (Note: The Acts of Parliament (Commencement) Act 1793.)
- Repealed: 1 January 1883

Other legislation
- Amends: See § Repealed enactments
- Repeals/revokes: See § Repealed enactments
- Amended by: Army Enlistment Act 1870; Regulation of the Forces Act 1881
- Repealed by: Reserve Forces Act 1882

Status: Repealed

Text of statute as originally enacted

The Reserve Force Act 1867 (30 & 31 Vict. c. 110) was an act of the Parliament of the United Kingdom that consolidated enactments related to the enrolment of Chelsea and Greenwich out-pensioners and East India Company pensioners as a reserve force in the United Kingdom.

== Provisions ==
=== Repealed enactments ===
Section 20 of the act repealed 5 enactments, listed in the schedule to the act.

Citation	Short title	Description	Extent of repeal
6 & 7 Vict. c. 95	Chelsea Hospital Out-pensioners Act 1843	An Act for rendering more effective the Services of such Out-Pensioners of Chelsea Hospital as shall be called out to assist in preserving the public Peace.	The whole act.
9 & 10 Vict. c. 9	Out-pensioners Services Act 1846	An Act for amending the Act for rendering effective the Services of the Chelsea Out-Pensioners, and extending it to the Out-Pensioners of Greenwich Hospital.	The whole act.
10 & 11 Vict. c. 54	Chelsea and Greenwich Out-pensioners Act 1847	An Act to amend the Acts for rendering effective the Service of the Chelsea and Greenwich Out-Pensioners.	The whole act.
11 & 12 Vict. c. 84	Chelsea and Greenwich Out-pensioners, etc. Act 1848	An Act to amend the Acts for rendering effective the Service of the Chelsea and Greenwich Out-Pensioners, and to extend them to the Pensioners of the East India Company.	The whole act.
22 & 23 Vict. c. 42	Reserve Force Act 1859	An Act to provide for the Establishment of a Reserve Force of Men who have been in Her Majesty's Service.	The whole act.

== Subsequent developments ==
The whole act was repealed by section 29 of, and the schedule to, the Reserve Forces Act 1882 (45 & 46 Vict. c. 48), which came into operation on 1 January 1883.
