= Volunteer Act 1863 =

Act of the Parliament of the United Kingdom

Volunteer Act 1863 (Note: Section 1.)
- Act of Parliament
- Parliament of the United Kingdom
- Long title: An Act to consolidate and amend the Acts relating to the Volunteer Force in Great Britain.
- Citation: 26 & 27 Vict. c. 65
- Territorial extent: England and Wales; Scotland; (Note: Section 53.)

Dates
- Royal assent: 21 July 1863
- Commencement: 21 July 1863 (Note: The Acts of Parliament (Commencement) Act 1793.)
- Repealed: 23 May 1950
Other legislation
| Amends | See § Repealed enactments |
| Repeals/revokes | See § Repealed enactments |
| Amended by | Regulation of the Forces Act 1881 |
| Repealed by | Statute Law Revision Act 1950 |

Status: Repealed

Text of statute as originally enacted

The Volunteer Act 1863 (26 & 27 Vict. c. 65) was an act of the Parliament of the United Kingdom that consolidated enactments related to the Volunteer Force in Great Britain.

== Provisions ==
=== Repealed enactments ===
Section 51 of the act repealed 13 enactments, listed in part (vi.) of the schedule to the act.

| Citation | Short title | Description | Extent of repeal |
|---|---|---|---|
| 44 Geo. 3. c. 54 | Yeomanry Act 1804 | An Act to consolidate and amend the Provisions of the several Acts relating to Corps of Yeomanry and Volunteers in Great Britain; and to make further Regulations relating thereto. | So far as the act relates to Volunteers in Great Britain. |
| 44 Geo. 3. c. 94 | Yeomanry (Accounts) Act 1804 | An Act to explain an Act of the present Session of Parliament, for consolidating and amending the Provisions of the several Acts relating to Corps of Yeomanry and Volunteers in Great Britain, so far as respects the accounting for Monies received by Volunteer Officers. | So far as the act relates to Volunteers in Great Britain. |
| 46 Geo. 3. c. 125 | Yeomanry, etc. Act 1806 | An Act for regulating the Rank of Officers in Yeomanry and Volunteer Corps. | So far as the act relates to Volunteers in Great Britain. |
| 46 Geo. 3. c. 140 | Militia (No. 2) Act 1806 | An Act to amend Two Acts passed in the Forty-second Year of His present Majesty, relating to the Militia of England and Scotland respectively, as to the Pay of the Officers and Men of the said Militia. | So far as the act relates to Volunteers in Great Britain. |
| 50 Geo. 3. c. 25 | Rifle Volunteer Grounds Act 1862 | An Act to amend several Acts relating to the Local Militia of Great Britain. | Section Three. |
| 53 Geo. 3. c. 81 | Militia Act 1813 | An Act to amend several Acts relating to the Militia, and to enlisting of the Militia into His Majesty's Regular Forces. | Section Four. |
| 56 Geo. 3. c. 39 | Yeomanry (Training) Act 1816 | An Act to reduce the Number of Days of Muster or Exercise of Yeomanry and Volunteer Cavalry. | So far as the act relates to Volunteers in Great Britain. |
| 57 Geo. 3. c. 44 | Yeomanry Act 1817 | An Act to allow Corps of Yeomanry or Volunteer Cavalry, when assembled for the Suppression of Riots or Tumults, to be quartered and billeted, and Officers on Half Pay to hold certain Commissions in such Corps, and to exempt Members in such Corps from serving the Office of Constable. | So far as the act relates to Volunteers in Great Britain. |
| 7 Geo. 4. c. 58 | Yeomanry Act 1826 | An Act to amend the Laws relating to Corps of Yeomanry Cavalry and Volunteers in Great Britain. | So far as the act relates to Volunteers in Great Britain, including the Provisions thereof relative to the Remuneration of the Clerks of Meetings therein mentioned, so far as that Remuneration has reference to the Execution of the Provisions of any act relating to Volunteers in Great Britain. |
| 23 & 24 Vict. c. 13 | Friendly Societies Act 1860 | An Act to prevent the Members of Benefit Societies from forfeiting their Interest therein by being enrolled in Yeomanry or Volunteer Corps. | So far as the act relates to Volunteers in Great Britain. |
| 23 & 24 Vict. c. 140 | Rifle Volunteer Grounds Act 1860 | The Rifle Volunteer Grounds Act, 1860. | The whole act. |
| 24 & 25 Vict. c. 126 | Volunteers Act 1861 | An Act to exempt the Volunteer Forces of Great Britain from the Payment of Tolls. | The whole act. |
| 25 & 26 Vict. c. 41 | N/A | An Act for amending "The Rifle Volunteer Grounds Act, 1860." | The whole act. |

== Subsequent developments ==
Volunteer Act 1897 (Note: Section 2.)
- Act of Parliament
- Parliament of the United Kingdom
- Long title: An Act to declare the Effect of the Provisions of the Volunteer Act, 1863, with respect to Rules for Volunteer Corps.
- Citation: 60 & 61 Vict. c. 47
- Territorial extent: United Kingdom

Dates
- Royal assent: 6 August 1897
- Commencement: 6 August 1897 (Note: The Acts of Parliament (Commencement) Act 1793.)
- Repealed: 10 March 1966
Other legislation
| Amends | Volunteer Act 1863 |
| Repealed by | Statute Law Revision Act 1966 |

Status: Repealed

Text of statute as originally enacted

The act was amended by the Volunteer Act 1897 (60 & 61 Vict. c. 47).

The whole act was repealed by section 1 of, and the first schedule to, the Statute Law Revision Act 1950 (14 Geo. 6. c. 6), which came into force on 23 May 1950.
