= Yeomanry Cavalry =

British volunteer military force

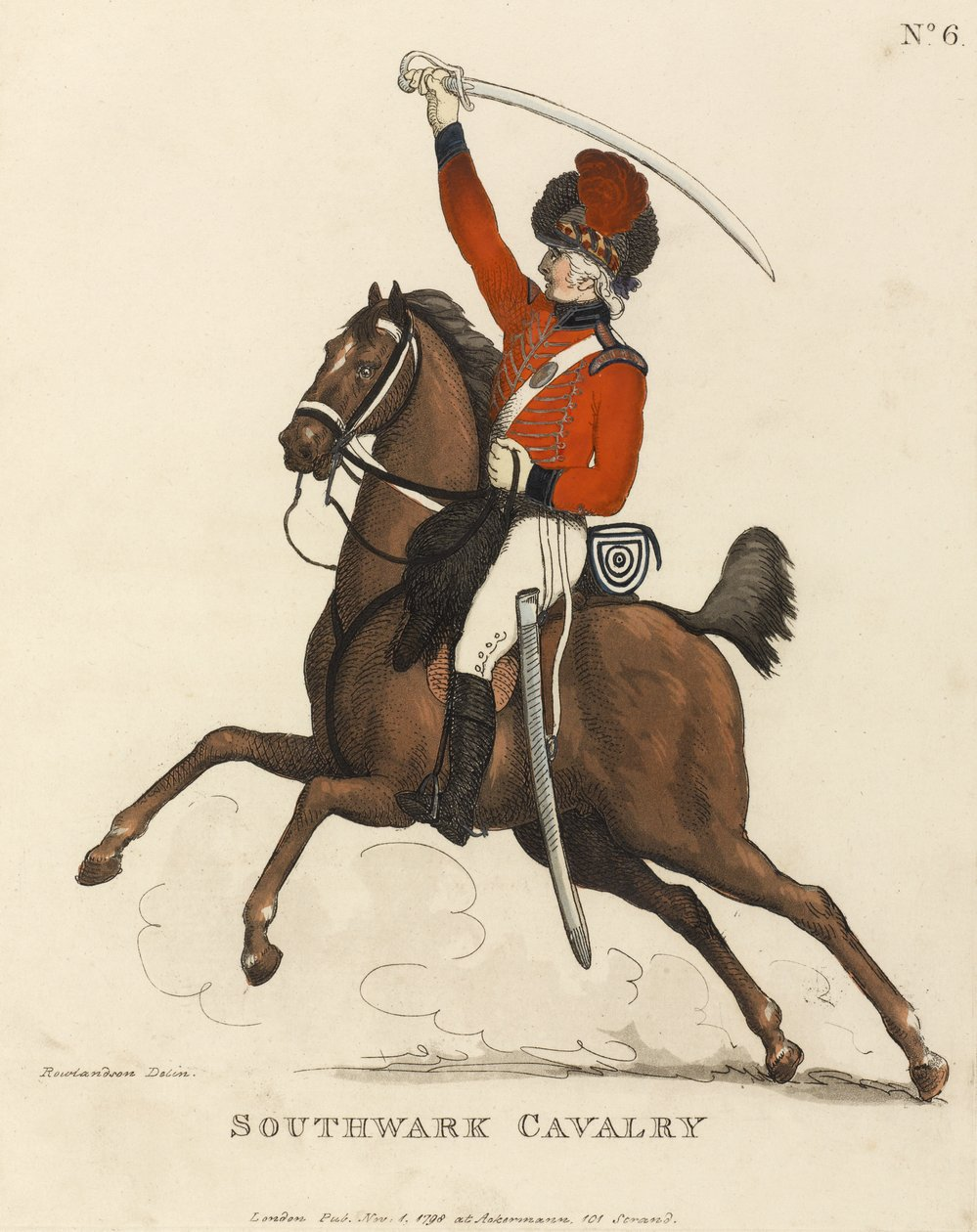
- 1798 engraving of a Southwark Volunteer Cavalry trooper
- Active: 1794–1908
- Country: Great Britain; United Kingdom
- Branch: British Volunteer Corps
- Type: Cavalry
- Role: Internal security
- Engagements: French Revolutionary Wars; Battle of Fishguard; Napoleonic Wars

The Yeomanry Cavalry was the mounted component of the British Volunteer Corps, a military reserve force established in 1794 amid fears of invasion and insurrection during the French Revolutionary Wars. A yeoman was a person of respectable standing, one social rank below a gentleman, and the yeomanry was initially a rural, county-based force. Members were required to provide their own horses and were recruited mainly from landholders and tenant farmers, though the middle class also featured prominently in the rank and file. Officers were largely recruited from among the British nobility and landed gentry. A commission generally involved significant personal expense, and although social status was an important qualification, the primary factor was personal wealth. The newly rich, who found in the yeomanry a means of enhancing their social standing, were welcomed into the officer corps for their ability to support the force financially. Urban recruitment increased towards the end of the 19th century, reflected in the early 20th century by increasingly common use of hired mounts.

The yeomanry was first used in support of local authorities to suppress civil unrest, most notably during the food riots of 1795. Its only use in national defence was in 1797, when the Castlemartin Yeomanry helped defeat a small French invasion in the Battle of Fishguard. Although the Volunteer Corps was disbanded following the defeat of Napoleon in 1815, the yeomanry was retained as a politically reliable force which could be deployed in support of the civil authorities. It often served as mounted police until the middle of the 19th century. Most famously, the Manchester and Salford Yeomanry was largely responsible for the Peterloo Massacre, in which 17 people were killed and up to 650 were injured, while policing a rally for parliamentary reform in Manchester in 1819. The yeomanry was also deployed against striking colliers in the 1820s, during the Swing riots of the early 1830s and the Chartist disturbances of the late 1830s and early 1840s. The exclusive membership set the yeomanry apart from the population it policed, and as better law enforcement options became available the yeomanry was increasingly held back for fear that its presence would provoke confrontation. Its social status made the force a popular target for caricature, particularly after Peterloo, and it was often satirised in the press, in literature and on the stage.

The establishment of civilian police forces and renewed invasion scares in the middle of the 19th century turned the focus of the yeomanry to national defence, but its effectiveness and value in this role was increasingly questioned. It declined in strength, surviving largely due to its members' political influence and willingness to subsidise the force financially. A series of government committees failed to address the force's problems. The last, in 1892, found a place for the yeomanry in the country's mobilisation scheme, but it was not until a succession of failures by the regular army during the Second Boer War that the yeomanry found a new relevance as mounted infantry. It provided the nucleus for the separate Imperial Yeomanry, and after the war, the yeomanry was re-branded en bloc as the Imperial Yeomanry. It ceased to exist as a separate institution in 1908, when the yeomanry became the mounted component of the Territorial Force. Yeomanry regiments fought mounted and dismounted in both the First World War and the Second World War. The yeomanry heritage is maintained in the 21st century largely by four yeomanry regiments of the British Army Reserve, in which many 19th century regiments are represented as squadrons.

== Background ==
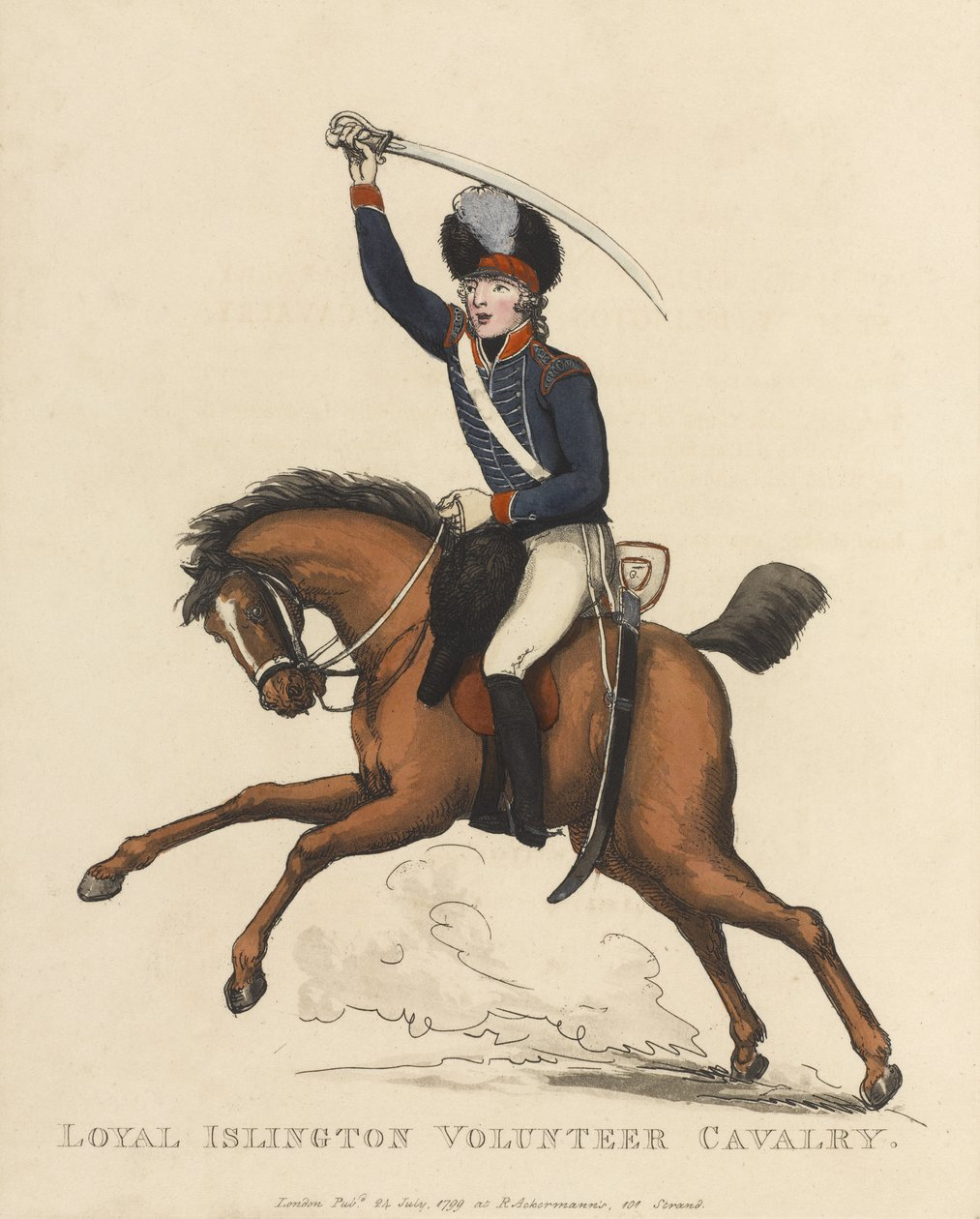
1798 engraving of a Loyal Islington Volunteer Cavalry trooper

From the mid-18th century onwards Europe began experiencing explosive population growth, which in Great Britain was fed by improved farming methods introduced by the British Agricultural Revolution. The concurrent Industrial Revolution led to a rapid increase in the urbanisation of Britain, which increased urban demand for food. The more intensive cultivation required to meet this demand led to higher costs but did not increase agricultural wages, resulting in increasing amounts of poverty and starvation in rural British communities. Poverty was also a problem in urban centres as the increasing use of machinery placed skilled labour out of work. Meanwhile, Britain's political system had not kept up with the changing population; while once prosperous towns that had become de-populated were still able to elect Members of Parliament, major new towns such as Birmingham and Manchester were not represented in the British Parliament. Poverty and disenfranchisement led to social discontent, giving rise to fears that the French Revolution, which began in 1789, would provide a model that might be emulated in Britain.

On 1 February 1793, Revolutionary France declared war on Britain, which was now faced with the risk of foreign invasion. The British Army, which had sent six brigades to the Low Countries as part of the Flanders campaign, was not sufficient to defend the country, and the militia was neither effective nor trustworthy. It had been demobilised following the end of the American War of Independence in 1783, and in the intervening decade had been subject to cost-cutting measures which left it deficient. The militia was embodied in 1792 as a precautionary measure against insurrection, but a body recruited predominantly from among the working class was itself suspect to the extent that militia units were not trusted to be deployed in their own areas of recruitment until 1795. The government had previously resorted to raising volunteers to augment its forces in 1779 amid fears of a Franco-Spanish invasion, though most of these units had been disbanded by 1793. Considering that there was not enough time to address the militia's deficiencies, the government turned again to volunteers to bolster the nation's defences in 1794.

== Origins ==
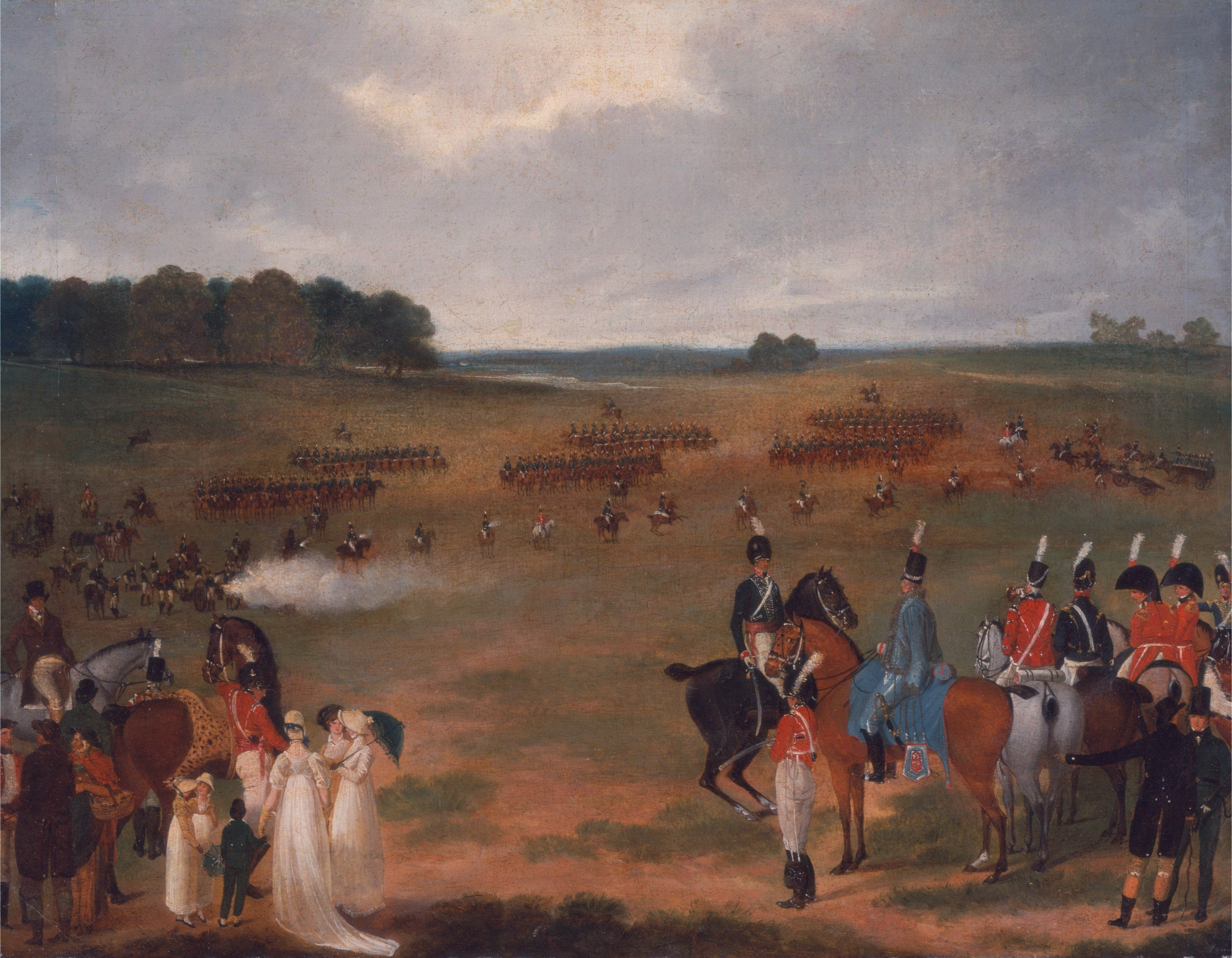
c. 1804 painting of London yeomanry units being reviewed on Hyde Park

The appeal for volunteers led to the creation of the Volunteer Corps, of which the Gentlemen and Yeomanry Cavalry, as it was then called, was the mounted component. A yeoman was traditionally a freeholder of respectable standing, one social rank below a gentleman, and the yeomanry's ranks were filled largely by landholders and tenant farmers. The officers were appointed by royal commission, in the person of the Lord Lieutenant, and generally came from the British nobility and landed gentry. Yeomen were expected to provide their own mounts, which represented a high financial barrier to entry and ensured that the yeomanry was an exclusive and prestigious organisation. In addition to farmers, the yeomanry attracted professionals, tradesmen and skilled craftsmen to its ranks, though the strong ties to the farming community meant that yeomanry activities were scheduled with an eye on the agricultural calendar, and harvests in particular informed the training schedule.

The yeomanry was county based and could be called out (embodied) by the Lord Lieutenant or Sheriff. Members were paid while embodied and subject to military law in the event of invasion. Initially, troops were liable for service only in their home or adjacent counties, though some troops voted to be liable for service nationwide while others restricted themselves to service only in their home county. Although some troops quickly combined to form county regiments, such as the Wiltshire Yeomanry Cavalry in 1797, many remained independent for years. By the end of 1794, between 28 and 32 troops of yeomanry, each up to 60 men strong, had been raised. A government attempt to raise more cavalry by compulsion, the Provisional Cavalry Act 1796, increased interest in volunteer cavalry, and by 1799 there were 206 yeomanry troops. By 1800, all Provisional Cavalry units had been either disbanded or absorbed into the yeomanry, where they were frequently ostracised due to their lower social status.

=== Initial deployments ===
The yeomanry was as much an instrument of law and order as it was a military organisation, and its terms of service stressed defence against both insurrection and invasion. It was only once called upon to repulse a foreign invasion, in 1797, when the French Légion Noire landed at Fishguard in Wales, and the Castlemartin Yeomanry was part of the force that defeated the invaders in the Battle of Fishguard. (Note: The Castlemartin Yeomanry's successor, the Pembroke Yeomanry, was awarded the battle honour "Fishguard" in 1853. It is the only unit in the British Army to have been so recognised for battle on British soil.) The yeomanry was more active as a constabulary, and corps were called out during the treason trials in 1794, during the food riots of 1795, and in response to enclosure protests, the destruction wrought by Luddites and disturbances caused by disaffected, demobilised servicemen in the years leading up to the end of the wars with France.

By 1801, the yeomanry was 21,000 strong, with troops in most English, many Welsh and some Scottish counties. They were based in towns, villages and the estates of the nobility, and varied in quantity from one to more than twenty in any given county. Troops were also raised in Ireland, where they reflected the Protestant Ascendancy. The Peace of Amiens in 1802 resulted in reductions across the military, with cuts to the army and navy and the disembodiment of the militia. Legislation was passed to allow the Volunteer Corps to be retained without pay, but the yeomanry establishment nevertheless declined, only to increase again when war resumed in 1803. There were frequent invasion scares – most notably in 1804, when the beacons were lit in the Scottish lowlands and 3,000 volunteers and yeomanry assembled for what turned out to be a false alarm – and victory at the Battle of Trafalgar in 1805 did not fully eradicate the fears of a French landing.

=== Early 19th century legislation and decline ===
The threat of invasion occupied much of the British political thinking until the final defeat of Napoleon in 1815, and in the period 1802–1803 alone there were 21 separate pieces of legislation designed to raise forces either voluntarily or compulsorily for the defence of the nation. The Yeomanry Act 1804 (44 Geo. 3. c. 54), which effectively governed the yeomanry until 1901, rationalised the confusion of legislation. The net result was to make voluntary service more attractive, a significant motivation being to avoid the compulsion of service in the unpopular militia. Faced with a deluge of volunteers, the War Office attempted to limit numbers. This caused an outcry, and administrative responsibility was transferred to the Home Office in 1803 as a result. By the following year, the number of volunteers and yeomanry together exceeded 342,000 men, significantly more than the government could arm in the immediate term, and in 1805 the yeomanry numbered just under 33,000 men.

A change of government in 1806 resulted in a change of policy, based on the belief that the volunteer force was an expensive solution which escaped central government control and undermined recruitment into the militia and regular army. The Local Militia (England) Act 1808 (48 Geo. 3. c. 111) and Local Militia (Scotland) Act 1808 (48 Geo. 3. c. 150) created a new militia with incentives for volunteers to transfer into it. By 1813, the Local Militia had supplanted the need for a volunteer force, which had already declined to just under 69,000 men the previous year, and only a handful of volunteer corps remained. The yeomanry, however, was retained after the Napoleonic Wars as a politically reliable force. It was, nevertheless, reduced in numbers nationwide – figures for 1817 indicate an actual strength of around 18,000 – and in Gloucestershire, for example, of the 13 troops that existed in 1813, only the Gloucester Troop was kept on after 1815, to serve as mounted police.

== Support to the civil power ==
Policing was the responsibility of the parish constable and his urban counterpart, the watchman, under the auspices of the magistrates. As urban centres grew, increased crime was dealt with by temporary measures such as the Special Constabulary. None of these were sufficient to deal with large-scale riots. Although the regular army was disciplined and trusted enough to be used, it was too small and too widely dispersed to be an effective response, and the militia, while available as a local force, was not trusted. It fell, therefore, to the yeomanry to deal with civil unrest, and its numbers were soon increased as a result.

=== Post-Napoleonic Wars ===
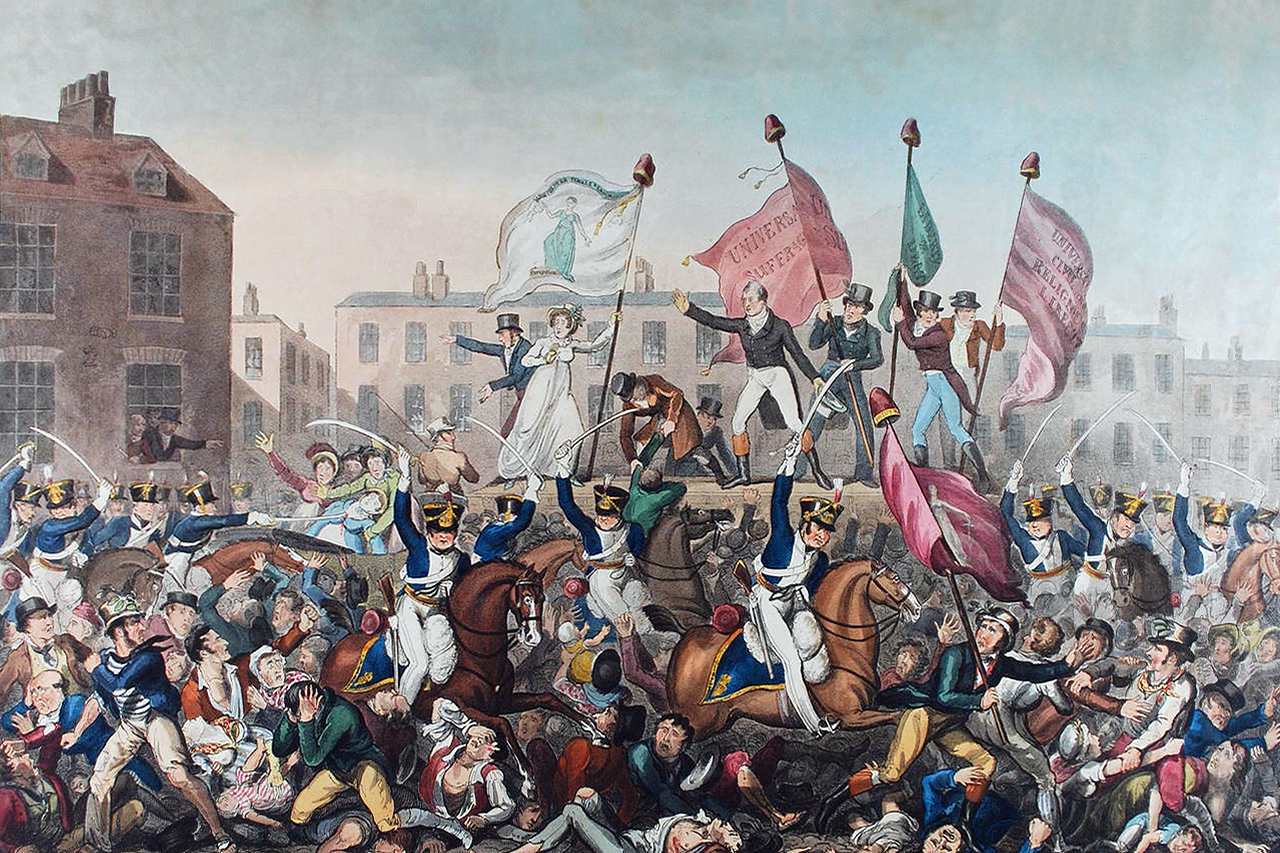
The Manchester and Salford Yeomanry committing the Peterloo Massacre

Agitation for constitutional reform by the Radical movement following the defeat of Napoleon resulted in frequent use of the yeomanry. Most famously, up to 17 people were killed and 650 wounded in the Peterloo Massacre of 1819, when the Manchester and Salford Yeomanry charged into a 60,000-strong crowd attending a rally in Manchester. (Note: The casualties at Peterloo vary according to source. Beckett reports "some 400" injured, and Mileham "over 500", with both saying 11 killed. Hay's sources give figures of 17 killed and 650 injured.) On 2 April 1820, the Stirlingshire Yeomanry was called out during the Radical War – a week of strikes and unrest in Scotland – and three days later its Kilsyth Troop assisted the regular army's 10th Hussars in the arrest of 18 Radicals at the 'Battle of Bonnymuir'. In south Wales during the violent collier strikes of 1822, the Monmouth Troop, assisting the Scots Greys, used the flat of its swords to disperse a mob that was damaging coal trains, and the colliers pelted the Chepstow Troop with stones as it escorted coal wagons a few days afterwards. Elsewhere, the Staffordshire Yeomanry resorted to musketry, mortally wounding one person, when it was deployed to protect working colliers from their striking colleagues. In total, the yeomen of 12 different corps were called out to support the civil authorities on 19 separate occasions in 1822, and four years later, 13 different corps attended to 16 incidents.

=== Swing riots and political protests ===
The demand for assistance was not uniform throughout the country, and even at its peak in 1820, less than 30 per cent of counties had called out their yeomanry. Civil unrest declined in the 1820s, and in 1827 local magistrates called upon the yeomanry only six times, a 90 per cent decrease compared to 1820. Faced with funding a force that it perceived to be increasingly unnecessary, the government reduced the yeomanry establishment on economic grounds. Of the 62 corps or regiments that then existed, those 24 that had not been called out in aid of the civil power in the preceding ten years, primarily from the southern counties of England, were disbanded. The remaining 38 corps were retained, though 16 of them were allowed to continue only at their own expense. It was, however, in the southern counties that the Swing riots erupted in 1830, a largely agrarian protest which resulted in the destruction of machinery in both town and country. As a result, many disbanded corps were resurrected and new ones raised, although it was a slow process and those corps of yeomanry that had survived the cuts were in much demand. The Wiltshire Yeomanry, for example, served in neighbouring counties as well as its own, earning it the prefix "Royal" in recognition of its many services. This regiment was responsible for the one fatality inflicted by the yeomanry during the riots, when its Hindon Troop fought a 500-strong mob of agricultural workers in the 'Battle of Pythouse' at Tisbury, Wiltshire, on 25 November 1830.

There was further civil unrest the year after the Swing riots, prompted by agitation for political reform following the defeat of the Second Reform Bill in the House of Lords. In Wales, the Glamorgan Yeomanry twice suffered humiliation – and in consequence, disbandment soon after – when miners and steelworkers occupied Merthyr Tydfil; one group of yeomen was ambushed and disarmed as they tried to make their way into town, and on a separate occasion another group was routed. Equally ineffective, though this time through no fault of its own, was a troop of the newly re-raised Gloucestershire Yeomanry. It was sent to Bristol when rioting broke out there in the autumn, but was ordered to leave shortly after arriving by the commander of the regular forces deployed in the city. A second troop of Gloucestershire yeomanry was subsequently joined by yeomen from Somerset and Wiltshire to help restore order in the aftermath of the rioting.

=== Chartist disturbances ===
Fearing that the yeomanry would provoke confrontation, the fledgling police force was, where available, used in preference to maintain order during the Chartist disturbances.

Although further urban unrest in the 1830s resulted in the deployment of the yeomanry in Montgomeryshire, Kent and Birmingham, the government legislated another round of cuts on cost grounds in 1838, reducing the 18,300-strong force by up to 4,700, though nine corps were allowed to continue without pay. As in 1827, the timing was unfortunate, and the rise of Chartism between 1837 and 1842 resulted in more demands on the yeomanry, to the extent that the commanders of the northern and Midlands military districts were given the ability to summon it directly rather than apply for permission to the Home Office. The greatest pressure came in 1842 – a year which saw six of the nine unpaid corps returned to the establishment and just under 1,000 new yeomen recruited – when civil unrest in 15 English, Welsh and Scottish counties required the deployment of 84 troops from 18 corps, which between them accumulated a total of 338 days' duty.

Despite being heavily committed, force was applied sparingly, and the yeomanry was deployed wherever possible as a reserve in support of other law enforcement agencies rather than as a primary agent itself. In 1838, a troop of the Yorkshire Yeomanry was held back during a serious disturbance on the North Midland Railway out of fear that their presence would inflame the situation. The following year, Sir Charles Napier, commander of the northern military district, responded to a magistrate request for yeomanry by saying "if the Chartists want a fight, they can be indulged without Yeomen, who are over-zealous for cutting and slashing". There were occasions when force was used, such as the violent confrontations in the Staffordshire Potteries and North Wales in 1839 between protesters and the yeomen of Staffordshire, Shropshire and Montgomeryshire; there were injuries on both sides and at least four deaths among the protesters.

=== Declining use as a constabulary ===
Between 1818 and 1855, the peak years of its employment in support of the civil power, units of yeomanry were on duty somewhere for approximately 26 days per year on average. It remained available as a constabulary throughout the 19th century, if for no other reason than it was often the only option available to the magistrates, even though it was recognised that its presence might escalate tensions. Its use in this role, however, declined, and the last known deployment in support of the civil power was in 1885. The diminishing demand was fuelled by a decrease in large-scale protest and better law-enforcement options. The development of a national rail network from the mid-19th century enabled rapid deployment of regular forces, and the establishment of police forces in all counties by 1856 gave magistrates a better alternative than the yeomanry.

In 1892, the Brownlow Committee, set up to investigate the financial and military position of the yeomanry, recommended that its constitution should be specially adapted for home defence, and in 1907 the yeomanry was formally relieved of any role in aid of the civil power. A select committee report in 1908, Employment of Military in Cases of Disturbances, encouraged a civil response to civil disorder. It recognised, however, the value of mounted forces, and recommended that police chiefs should maintain the ability to temporarily recruit men with yeomanry experience, casting yeomen thus enlisted as ordinary citizens subject to common law. The evolution of law enforcement can be seen in the government responses to the Tonypandy riots and the Liverpool general transport strike of 1910 and 1911, in which the yeomanry played no part when the regular army was deployed to restore order, supported in the former case by 500 Metropolitan Police.

== Role in national defence ==
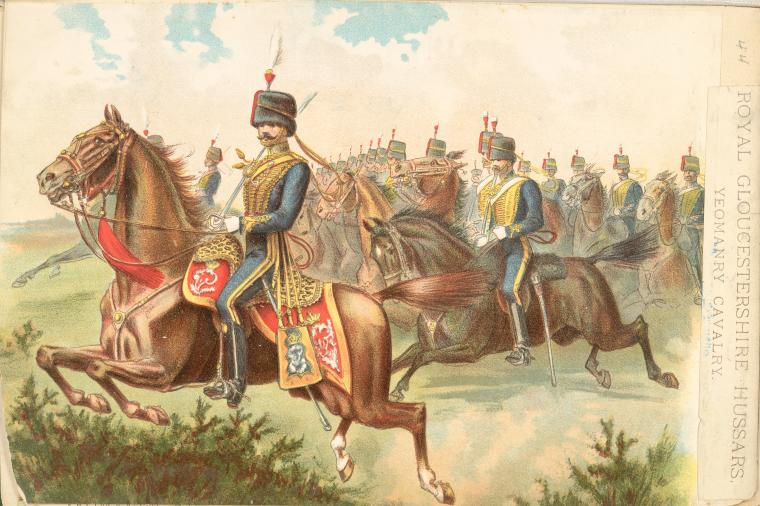
Yeomanry Cavalry of the late 19th century

In 1850, Henry FitzHardinge Berkeley, MP for Bristol, derided the yeomanry in Parliament as "maintained at vast expense; in peace a charge, in war a weak defence". By 1891, the force suffered, according to the Earl of Airlie – an experienced cavalry officer who was at the time adjutant of the Hampshire Carabiniers and who would later be killed leading the 12th Lancers in South Africa – from a lack of purpose and training. As its constabulary duties subsided, the yeomanry was left without any real role between the 1860s and 1892. Militarily weak and few in number, its effectiveness and value as a national defence force was increasingly questioned. It was regarded, not least among the members themselves, as light or auxiliary cavalry, and the yeomanry regiments adopted the titles of hussars, dragoons and lancers. Their training, in which they practised complex regular cavalry drills at the halt, emphasised the use of the sword. It was wedded to the idea of a cavalry role, despite increasing efforts by the government to encourage proficiency in the use of firearms.

The yeomanry was left untouched by the Volunteer Act 1863 (26 & 27 Vict. c. 65), which governed the new Volunteer Force, leaving it still subject to legislation passed in 1804, although some changes were made to the way in which it was administered. More substantial changes were considered in a series of committees which attempted to assess the state and role of the yeomanry, and although the first, the Lawrenson Committee of 1861, achieved nothing, some changes to the organisation were made in 1870 by Edward Cardwell, Secretary of State for War. Independent troops and corps with less than four troops were abolished and the established strength set at 36 regiments, and basic training and drill requirements were laid down. There is also evidence that Cardwell hoped to transform the yeomanry from cavalry to mounted rifles, and an attempt to do so was also made in 1882, though both came to nothing. The Stanley Committee of 1875 recommended better training for the yeomanry leadership and the disbandment of regiments that returned an effective strength of less than 200 men for two consecutive years. Although the former was implemented, the latter was ignored.

Training in the latter half of the 19th century focussed more on mounted reconnaissance, flank protection and pickets, activities regarded by traditional cavalrymen as beneath their dignity, but it was rarely realistic, and the yeomanry proved resistant to the introduction of musketry standards. The Brownlow Committee sought to define a more professional role for the yeomanry by incorporating it into the nation's mobilisation scheme. As a result, in 1893, regiments were organised by squadron rather than troop, and understrength regiments were paired into brigades. In another attempt to encourage the use of firearms, allowances were increased for those who achieved a certain level of proficiency in musketry, but those who failed to do so in two consecutive years would be expelled. Nevertheless, the yeomanry's continued existence owed more to its significant representation in Parliament, which gave it a political influence beyond its numbers, than it did to its utility as a national defence force. (Note: The numbers of yeomen serving in either the House of Commons or the House of Lords were: 1843 – 14; 1847 – 22; 1850 – 65 (some eight per cent of the yeomanry officer corps); 1852 – 52; 1870 – 66; 1882 – 74; and 1897 – 66 (with a further 18 former members of the yeomanry).) The changes introduced by the Brownlow Committee were, according to Henry Campbell-Bannerman, leader of the Liberal Party then in opposition, the yeomanry's last chance to justify its existence.

=== Imperial Yeomanry ===
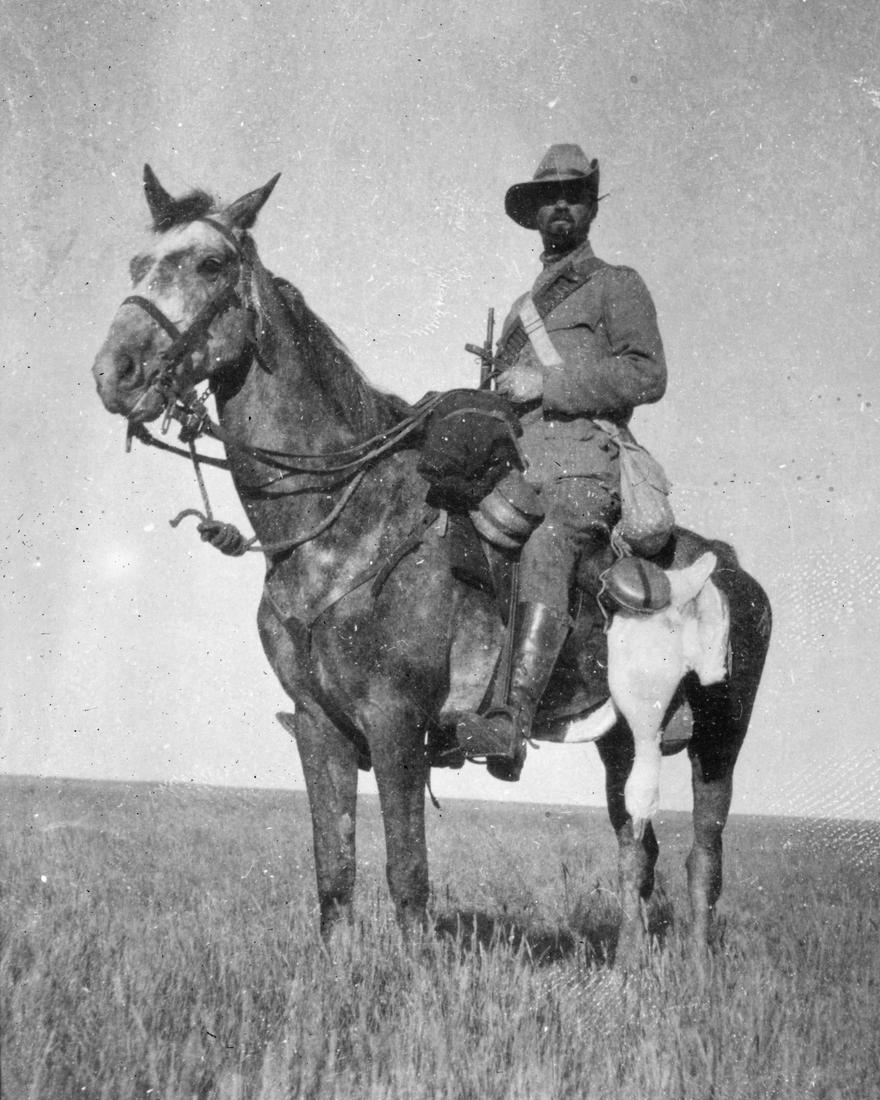
A trooper of the Imperial Yeomanry

By 1899, the yeomanry was at its lowest point. It was a small force, largely untouched by developments since its founding in 1794, of uncertain value and unclear benefit. It took major failures in the regular forces during the Second Boer War to restore the yeomanry to relevance. In October and November 1899, Lieutenant-Colonel A. G. Lucas, the yeomanry's representative in the War Office and a member of the Loyal Suffolk Hussars, suggested the yeomanry as a source of reinforcement in South Africa. His proposal was initially declined, but the disastrous events of Black Week in December, in which the British Army suffered three defeats in quick succession, prompted a rethink, and on 2 January 1900 the Imperial Yeomanry was created. It was a separate body from the domestic yeomanry, free of the home force's restriction to service only in the UK, and was organised by companies and battalions rather than squadrons and regiments, betraying its role as mounted infantry rather than cavalry.

By the end of the war, some 34,000 volunteers had served in the Imperial Yeomanry, although little more than 12 per cent of that number had been recruited from the domestic yeomanry. The experience in South Africa convinced the authorities of the value of a mounted force and influenced the Militia and Yeomanry Act 1901 (1 Edw. 7. c. 14). The law transformed the yeomanry, which it renamed en bloc to Imperial Yeomanry, from cavalry into mounted infantry, replacing the sword with rifle and bayonet as the yeoman's primary weapon. It introduced khaki uniforms, mandated a standard four-squadron organisation and added a machine-gun section to each regiment. The yeomanry resisted the retirement of the sword and the loss of "cavalry" from its title, a reflection of its own aspirations and the wider debate about the role of cavalry. (Note: Three regiments petitioned the king to be allowed to retain the sword on parade, and all but one of the 35 commanding officers petitioned the army for its retention in 1902. Colonel Lancelot Rolleston, commander of the South Nottinghamshire Imperial Yeomanry, went further, and refused to surrender the regiment's swords on the grounds that the regulations permitted their use until the equipment was worn out, and even introduced the lance to the regiment in 1904. With some string-pulling, the regiment secured for itself a place in the Northern Command review in 1903, in which it drilled alongside the regular forces as cavalry and paraded without rifles. The desire to retain the sword was not unanimous, and at an Army Council meeting in 1904 in which use of the sword was revisited, 21 of the now 55 yeomanry commanding officers were in favour of the bayonet. Demonstrating that the debate about the yeomanry role went on even within the yeomanry, their reasoning was that the force might be useful as mounted infantry or rifles, but it could never hope to become efficient cavalry.)

=== Territorial Force ===
A key issue exposed by the Boer War concerned the ability of the auxiliary forces to reinforce the regular army in times of crisis. In 1903, the Director of General Mobilisation and Military Intelligence reported an excess of home defence forces which, because they were not liable for service overseas, could not be used to expand an expeditionary force in foreign campaigns. This occupied much of the debate around military reform in the first decade of the 20th century, and gave the yeomanry the opportunity to retain its role as cavalry by positioning itself as a semi-trained reserve to the numerically weak regular cavalry. This was reflected in a change to the training instructions issued to the Imperial Yeomanry in 1902 and 1905. The former warned the yeomanry not to aspire to a cavalry role and made no distinction between yeomen and mounted infantry, but the latter merely proscribed the traditional cavalry tactic of shock action while otherwise aligning the yeomanry with the cavalry.

The changed focus in training was prompted by plans to allocate six yeomanry regiments as divisional cavalry in the regular army, supported by the establishment within the Imperial Yeomanry of a separate class of yeoman free of the restriction on service overseas. This, however, relied on men volunteering for such service, and offered the regular army no guarantee that enough men would do so. That enough would volunteer was made more doubtful by the requirement that they should abandon their civilian lives for the six months of training considered necessary for them to be effective in such a reserve role. As a result, the plans were dropped from the final legislation that combined the Volunteer Force and the yeomanry, now without the "Imperial" prefix, into a single, unified auxiliary organisation, the Territorial Force, in 1908. (Note: The difficulties inherent in relying on volunteers to reliably augment the regular army can be seen in the numbers, or more accurately the distribution of those who had done so by 1913. At just under 4,000, the quantity of volunteers exceeded the estimated requirements, but 88 per cent of them were distributed across 54 different regiments, making it too complex to integrate them into the regular forces.) (Note: As well as defence against foreign invasion, the Territorial Force was intended to reinforce the regular army overseas after six months training on mobilisation. The force was, however, subject to the same restrictions on overseas service as its predecessors, and deployment abroad therefore relied entirely on members volunteering to do so. Richard Haldane, the Secretary of State for War who introduced the reforms, hoped that between a sixth and a quarter of territorials would. The process by which members could volunteer was formalised in 1910 as the Imperial Service Obligation.) The yeomanry ceased to be a discrete institution and was, as one yeoman put it, "slumped in with the volunteers".

== Recruitment ==
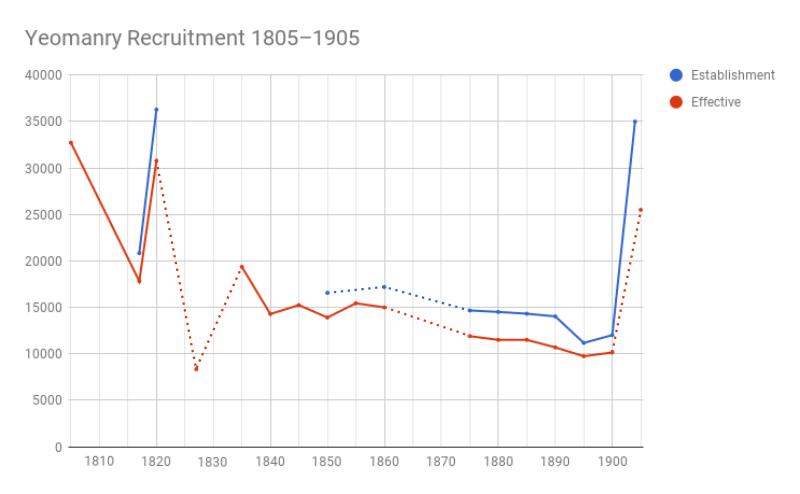
Yeomanry recruitment 1805–1905, showing establishment (authorised) and effective (actual) strength. Broken lines represent no data available between known datum points.

In the first half of the 19th century, the number of corps and overall strength fluctuated in line with the incidence of civil disturbance, reflecting the government's reliance on the yeomanry as a police force and its willingness to finance it. Peterloo sullied the yeomanry's reputation in many quarters, but it also prompted a surge in recruitment, reversing the reductions implemented after the end of the Napoleonic Wars. By 1820, the yeomanry establishment had been restored to its war-time peak of some 36,000 men, although its effective strength was actually some 6,000 short of that number. The same cycle was repeated in the late 1820s when, after 10 years of political stability, the government reduced the yeomanry to between 8,350 and 10,700 men, (Note: Sources do not agree on the exact scale of cuts made to the yeomanry in 1827. Beckett reports that the established strength fell from 24,288 to 10,705, while Hay reports that the yeomanry was reduced "by around" 21,332 to 8351 "in the ranks", without specifying whether he is referring to established or effective strength. Hay does add in a footnote that the values are approximate because in the period from 1821 to 1830, figures are available only for 1829.) only to increase it again in the 1830s following the outbreak of the Swing riots. Yeomanry strength peaked on this cycle in 1835 at an effective strength of 19,365.

Further government cuts in 1838 were once again reversed after the outbreak of the Chartist disturbances, and effective strength peaked again in 1845 at 15,249 men. Numbers subsequently fell once more, and although they were bolstered by invasion scares in the middle of the 19th century, a general decline set in as the yeomanry role in support of the civil power diminished. By 1900, the yeomanry establishment stood at just over 12,000 with an actual strength some 2,000 short of that figure. A wave of enthusiasm during the Second Boer War doubled the size of the yeomanry, and the Militia and Yeomanry Act 1901 (1 Edw. 7. c. 14) set an establishment of 35,000, though effective strength was only around 25,000. To achieve these numbers, 18 new regiments were raised, 12 of them resurrected from disbanded 19th century corps.

=== Officer corps ===
A commission in the yeomanry's officer corps entailed expenses which, for a troop captain in 1892, were on average £60 per year (equivalent to £6,591 in 2025) in excess of allowances received. These costs imposed a financial qualification on appointments and made such positions the preserve of the elite. While a proportion of the yeomanry's leadership, between eight and fifteen per cent over the course of its existence, came from the nobility, the main demographic from which officers were recruited was the landed gentry. The coincidence of wealth and position in society was reflected in the leadership of the yeomanry. In 1850, for example, 31 per cent of the officer corps were magistrates and a further 14 per cent held even greater authority as a Lord or Deputy Lieutenant, and the 828 yeomanry officers then serving included 5 Lords Lieutenant, 111 Deputy Lieutenants, 255 Justices of the Peace, 65 Members of Parliament and 93 officers with previous military experience. This element changed little over time, and the number of county elites serving in 1914 was practically the same as in 1850.

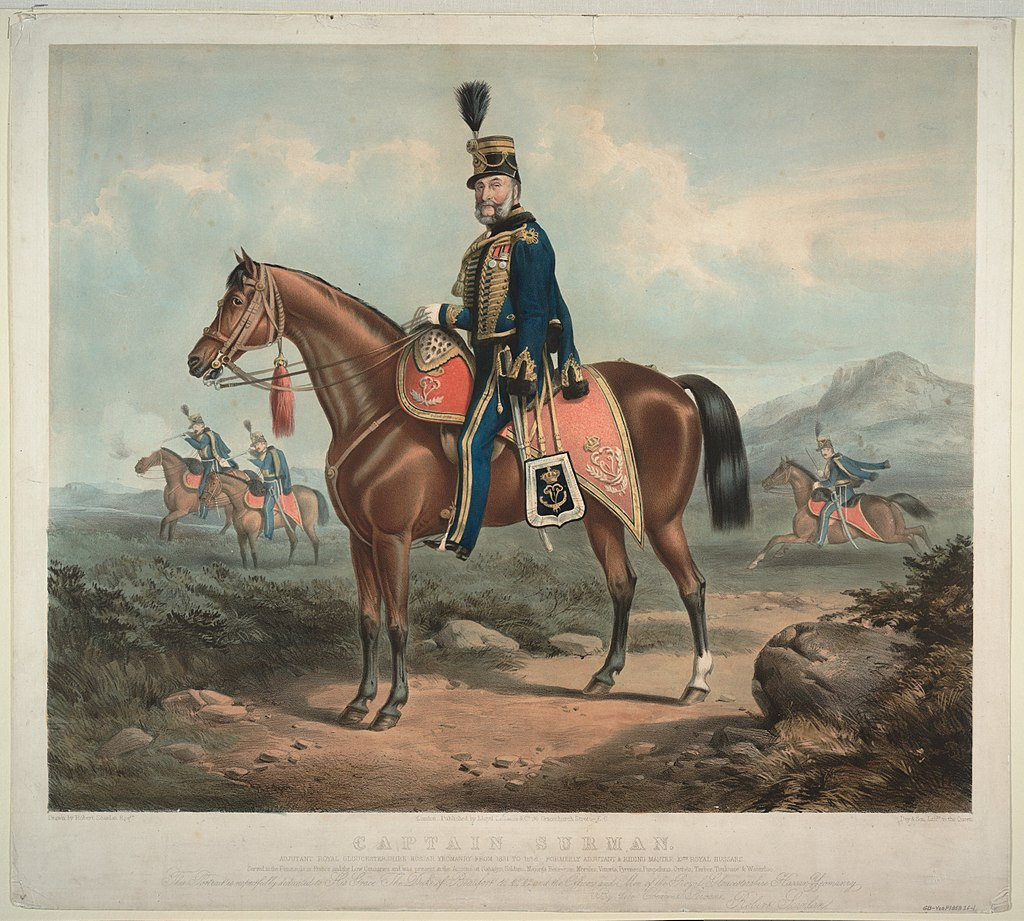
Captain Surman, ex-10th Royal Hussars, adjutant of the Royal Gloucestershire Hussars 1834–1858.

Although social status was in some cases a prerequisite for commissions, personal wealth was the predominant factor. With its access to the county elite and appetite for wealth, the yeomanry officer corps was an avenue for 'new money' to gain social status and position. This was evident even in the early days – the Staffordshire Yeomanry contained a number of newly rich officers from industry and business before 1820 – and increasing numbers were able to elevate their social position via commissions in the yeomanry throughout the 19th century. Another theme in officer recruitment was family tradition. The Churchill family, for example, was involved in the Queen's Own Oxfordshire Hussars between 1818 and 1914, the last being Winston Churchill, who commanded a squadron even while Home Secretary and later First Lord of the Admiralty. Dukes of Beaufort served with the Royal Gloucestershire Hussars for over 150 years from its formation in 1834, providing the regiment's colonel or honorary colonel for all but 13 of them.

The high barrier to entry meant that the pool of officer candidates was limited, and the yeomanry consistently struggled to find enough officers. Those that were found were sometimes of questionable value. Officers were not always able to attend to their yeomanry duties, either because they lived too far away or, as in the case of Winston Churchill, had more pressing demands on their time. In 1875, an inspecting officer complained about inefficiency in troop leadership, but the introduction of mandatory formal training for yeomanry officers that year did not improve matters. Lord Chesham, Inspector General of the Imperial Yeomanry in South Africa during the Second Boer War, spoke in 1904 of the poor quality of yeomanry officers during that conflict. Promotions were more an indication of an officer's precedence, in both society and regiment, and his ability to spend time and money on the latter, than of his merit for the role.

An element of professionalism was provided by ex-regular army officers, who comprised 23 per cent of the officer corps in 1876 and 14 per cent in 1914. Furthermore, within each corps, training and administration was controlled by a permanent staff led by an adjutant of at least four years regular military experience. (Note: Two notable men who served as yeomanry adjutants were the future Chief of the General Staff, John French, who served with the Northumberland Hussars between 1881 and 1884, and Adrian Carton de Wiart, who was appointed adjutant to the Royal Gloucestershire Hussars in 1910.) Even then, social status was often a factor in the selection of adjutants and, with applications being made directly to the colonel of a regiment, a measure of county influence was required for appointment.

=== Rank and file ===
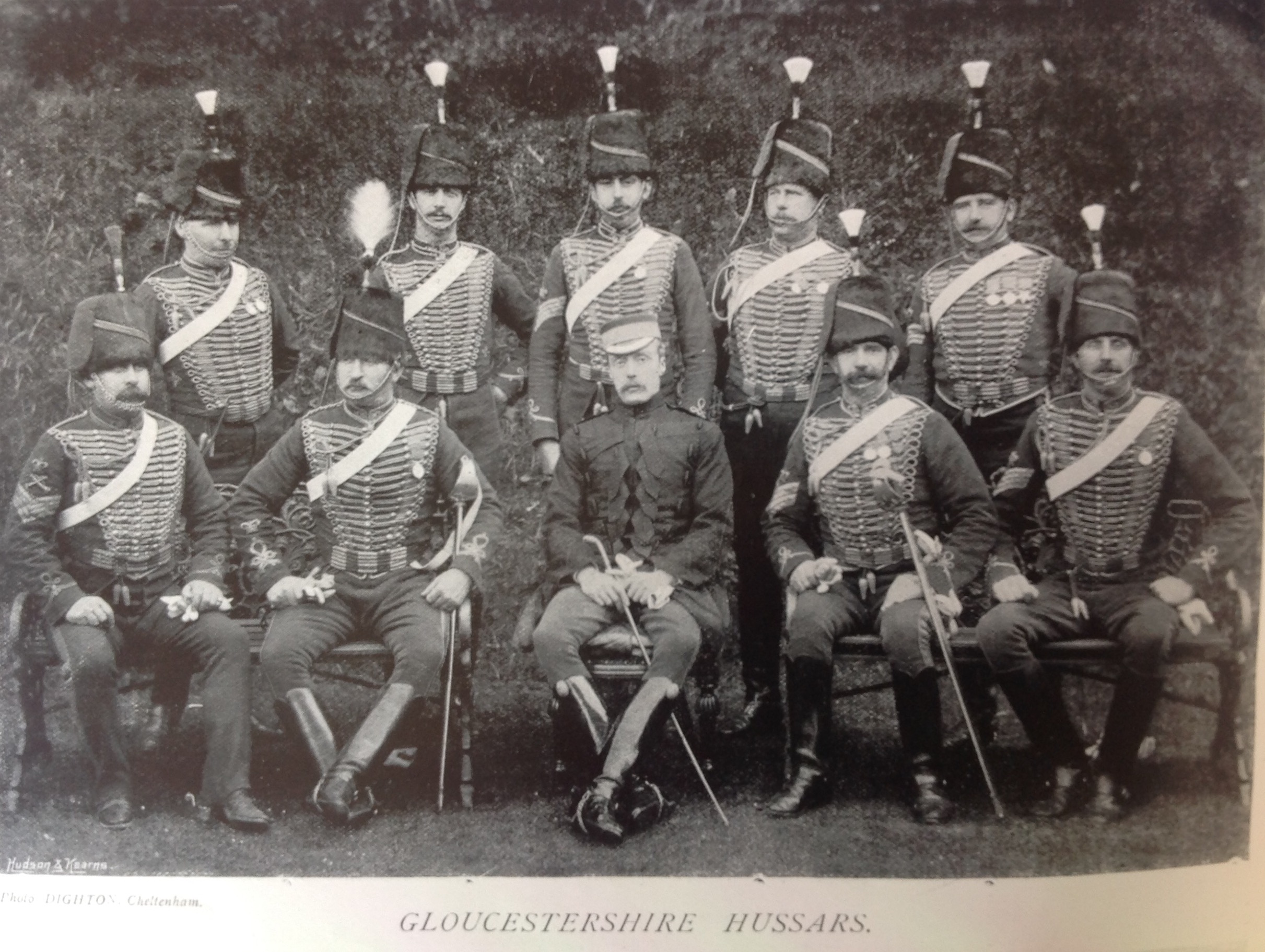
Sergeants of the Royal Gloucestershire Hussars yeomanry

In 1889, an MP described the yeomanry as "a survival from the days when tenants followed their landlords to the field". There is evidence that some of the rank and file were required to serve as a condition of their tenancy, in one case as late as 1893. On the whole, however, landlords did not have the ability, or at least the will, to coerce a tenantry which served, or indeed refused to serve, of its own free will. If the county elite commanded any influence in this matter, it was generally, in the class-driven society of 19th-century Britain, on terms of deference rather than subservience. (Note: A small number of known estate clauses, dating largely from the first half of the 19th century, has given rise to a stereotype of a yeomanry rank and file forced to serve by landlords. More likely, it was a "softer paternalism" that motivated voluntary service by a deferential tenantry seeking to curry favour with landlords.)

Although farmers represented the largest single demographic in the rank and file, statistics indicate that, between 1817 and 1915, just under half of yeomen were recruited from outside of the farming community. Other demographics appearing in the albeit incomplete data were merchants (4.9 per cent), professionals (5.6 per cent), small businessmen (14.9 per cent), artisans (13.5 per cent) and skilled or unskilled labourers (4.9 per cent). (Note: Merchants sold or produced goods on a large scale, examples being grain merchants, warehousemen and manufacturers. Examples of professionals include lawyers, physicians, bankers, accountants, and also clerks. Small businessmen were innkeepers, hoteliers, butchers, grocers and tailors. Artisans provided a highly skilled service, examples being farriers, carpenters, masons and builders. Skilled labour included bricklayers, apprentices and machine operators, and unskilled labourers included agricultural, construction, mine and shop workers.) In some cases the ratio of farmers within the same corps varied over time, an example being the Ayrshire Yeomanry, which comprised over 81 per cent farmers and their sons in 1831, a number which dropped to just over 60 per cent by 1880. The 1st Devon Yeomanry, on the other hand, shows largely unchanged ratios for the years 1834 (44.7 per cent) and 1915 (40.2 per cent). The ratios also varied between corps; for example, over 76 per cent of the Lanarkshire Yeomanry (Upper Ward) between 1822 and 1826 were farmers, but the Manchester and Salford Yeomanry of 1819 contained none.

The early appearance of the Manchester and Salford Yeomanry demonstrates an urban theme in yeomanry recruitment that became more marked as the 19th century progressed, influenced to some extent by an agricultural downturn in the late-19th century. In contrast to Lanarkshire's Upper Ward regiment, its Glasgow and Lower Ward regiment, raised in 1848 and later to become the Queen's Own Royal Glasgow Yeomanry, was recruited from the city's middle classes. In the 1860s, the Leicestershire Yeomanry and the South Salopian Yeomanry (Shropshire) were both recruiting from towns in their territories, and by 1892 all but one troop of the Middlesex Yeomanry were recruited in London. The urban element was not without its own issues of class. The rank and file of the Edinburgh Troop in the 1830s consisted mainly of gentlemen who were charged £12 (equivalent to £1,185 in 2025) to join, and the commander of the Middlesex Yeomanry's B Troop, which was known as the gentlemen's troop, believed there would be class friction if it was forced by the new squadron system of 1893 to join a troop of lesser status.

The increasing use of hired mounts, particularly after the turn of the century, also indicates a dilution of the rural contingent in the rank and file. The percentage of horses that were hired rose dramatically, from up to 14 per cent in the last quarter of the 19th century to around 50 per cent in the period 1905–1907. Although this was a predictable trend in the case of, for example, the largely urban-recruited Middlesex Yeomanry, the more rurally-based East Kent Yeomanry experienced a progressive decline in the ownership of horses, from 76 per cent in 1880 to 66 per cent in 1884 and a little over a half in 1894.

== Popular perception ==
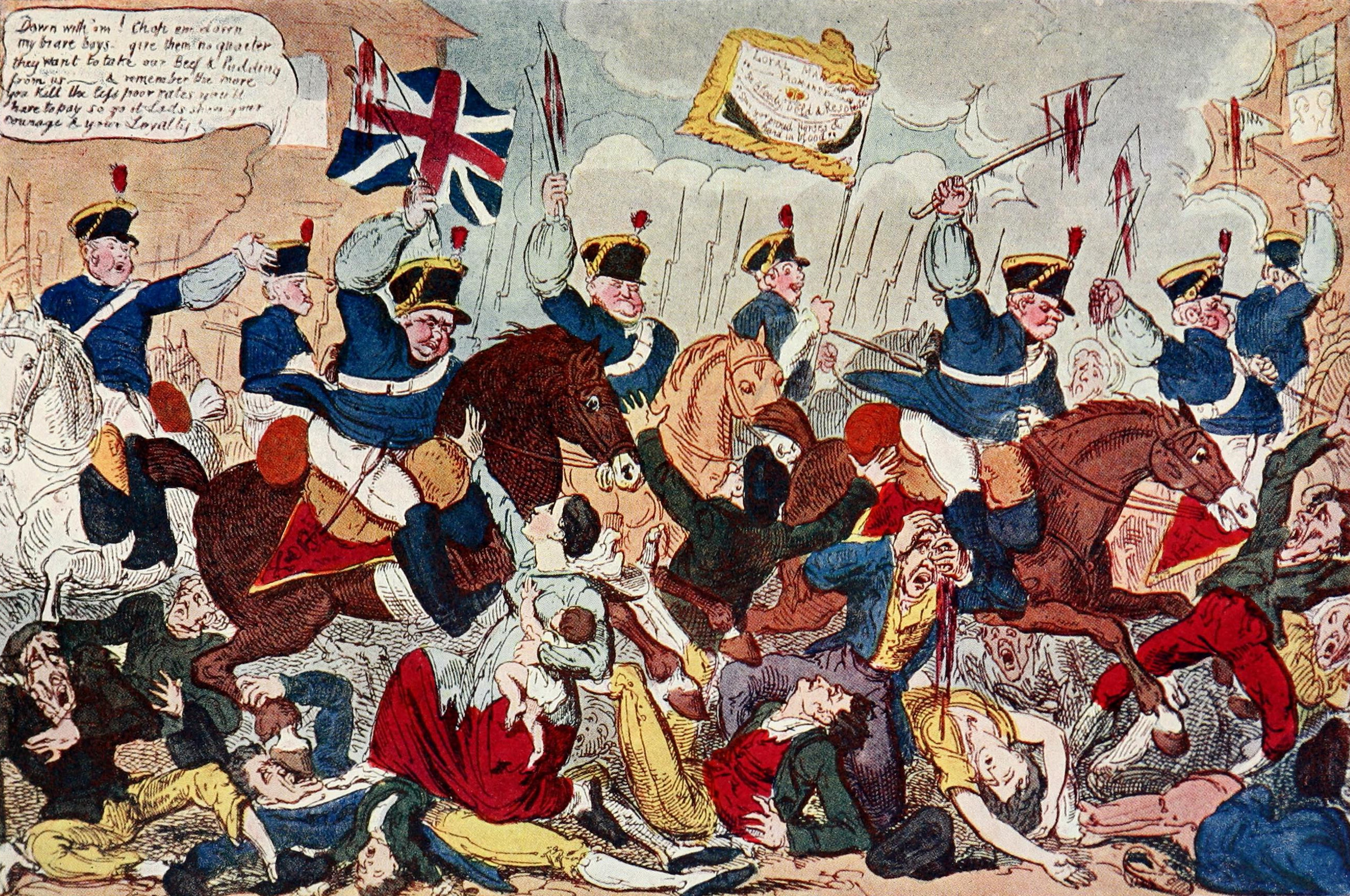
The Massacre of Peterloo by caricaturist George Cruikshank

Peterloo polarised opinions in the press, the Radical outlets framing it in terms of murder and massacre and the establishment outlets tending more to a defence of the yeomanry. Although an extreme episode, the events at St. Peter's Field coloured perceptions of the yeomanry among the politically involved working class, who equated it with the abuse of civil power. Negative perceptions persisted long after the event, even in the upper echelons of society, and as late as 1850 Peterloo was referenced when the yeomanry's "inclinations" were criticised in Parliament. In the mainstream national press, however, as Peterloo became yesterday's news, so too did the yeomanry, and, outside of public events which it attended in a ceremonial role, it was seldom reported on. More often, the yeomanry was the subject of caricature, in which yeomen were portrayed as old, incompetent and waving blood-stained weapons. Caricature evolved into satire, and magazines such as Punch regularly ridiculed the force as the epitome of bumbling high society, with overweight yeomen unable to master their weapons or the sick, undersized horses they rode. Common themes in the portrayal of the yeomanry in books and on stage included amateurs with delusions of grandeur, social climbing, self-importance and a greater concern for leisure and appearance than national defence.

The yeomanry's less confrontational activities resulted in a more positive interaction with the general public. It was often generous in its support for local charities, and its gatherings, whether for training or social events, injected wealth into local economies, to the extent that towns would petition regiments to be selected as venues for such occasions. Sporting events and pageantry, particularly the many occasions on which the yeomanry escorted royalty and visiting dignitaries, also drew appreciative crowds. The presentation of colours to the Wiltshire Yeomanry in 1798, for example, was watched by over 20,000 spectators, yeomanry bands entertained visitors at the opening of the Nottingham Arboretum in 1852, and the Royal Midlothian Yeomanry Cavalry Races in 1863 attracted a considerable attendance.

Although the political allegiance of yeomanry MPs in the House of Commons was fairly evenly split between the two main parties by the early 20th century, this was after a gradual shift in political affiliations since 1843, when the ratio of politically active members of the yeomanry was significantly Tory. (Note: In 1843, some 80 per cent of yeoman politicians were Conservative, declining to 68 per cent in 1852 and around 50 per cent in 1870, and increasing only slightly in favour of the Conservatives by 1908.) The Satirist cast the yeomanry as "ultra Tories" in 1838, and the perception of the force as an instrument of the Tory establishment made some local authorities cautious in its use against political reformers during the Chartist disturbances. In terms of the yeomanry leadership at least, the nature of the reform movement in the first half of the 19th century meant that the yeomanry was regularly pitted against a different class, but it was called upon to do so by governments of both political parties. Furthermore, its membership was not without sympathies for the causes it was called upon to police, and there are a number of cases in the early 1830s where the loyalties of some of its corps were doubted.

== Funding, remuneration and terms of service ==
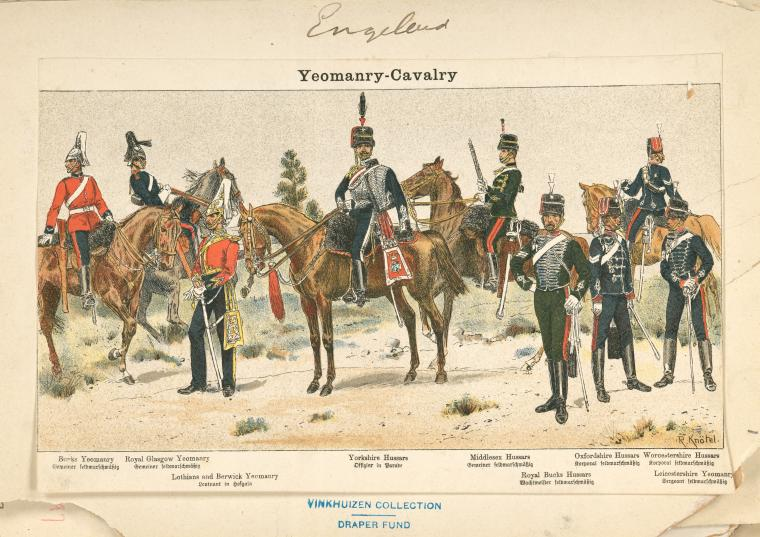
Different uniforms of various yeomanry regiments c. 1899

Yeomen had to provide their own horses, but saddlery and uniforms were paid for, either by the officers or by subscriptions in the counties in which the troops were raised, leading to a variety of colourful and flamboyant choices in attire. Their weapons – swords, pistols and a proportion of carbines per troop – were funded by the government. Other than when called out for duty, when it would be paid as regular cavalry, the yeomanry received no remuneration until 1803, when the first allowances were granted. The confused legislation of the early 19th century meant that different corps, and even different troops within the same corps, operated under different terms and conditions until the Yeomanry Act 1804 (44 Geo. 3. c. 54) introduced some uniformity. It restricted pay to a maximum of 24 days per annum, set 12 days of training as the qualification for exemption from conscription into other auxiliary arms, offered bounties for active service and gave yeomen the right to resign on 14 days notice. It did not, however, amend the different areas of liability (military district or nationwide) set by previous legislation. In 1816, the annual training requirement was reduced to eight days, inclusive of two days travelling, and the next year an annual allowance of £1 10s (equivalent to £139 in 2024) per yeoman was awarded to help with uniform and equipment costs.

In addition to weapons and allowances, expenses incurred by the government in maintaining the yeomanry included the permanent staff, compensation for losses and injuries to men and horses, and pay at 7s per day for annual training and when called out. Volunteers also benefitted by exemption from hair powder duty until 1869 and horse duty until 1874. Between 1816 and 1821, the cost of maintaining the yeomanry had risen by nearly 46 per cent, and with only seven per cent of the total cost directly attributable to aiding the civil power in 1819, governments struggled to justify the expense. Cuts to the force on economic grounds were legislated twice, in 1827 and 1838, saving £92,000 (equivalent to £10,230,400 in 2024) and £22,000 (equivalent to £2,718,222 in 2024) respectively.

Government funding, however, consistently fell short of actual requirements. Subsidisation of the yeomanry by its members, particularly the officers, was common practice throughout its existence, and not only during those periods when corps were maintained at their own expense. Lord Plymouth paid £6,200 (equivalent to £766,044 in 2024) to equip a troop of Worcestershire Yeomanry in 1832, and the Earl of Dudley was reputed to have spent £4,000 (approximately equivalent to £560,000 in 2024) per year on the same corps between 1854 and 1871. The second Duke of Buckingham and Chandos was said to have been bankrupted in 1848 in part by the massive contribution he made to his regiment, which received no government funding between 1827 and 1830. In 1882, it was calculated that officers paid an average of £20 each (equivalent to £2,080 in 2025) and the men up to £5 each (equivalent to £520 in 2025) towards the cost of their regiments, giving a total subsidy of £61,500 (equivalent to £6,396,545 in 2025) in a year when the government voted a £69,000 budget (equivalent to £9,591,000 in 2024) for the yeomanry. Twenty years later, the annual cost of being a yeomanry officer was estimated to be £100 (equivalent to £10,627 in 2025) in excess of the pay and allowances received by the officer. This willingness to support itself with private funding was another major factor in the yeomanry's survival after its usefulness in suppressing civil disorder disappeared.

Changes were made to the yeomanry terms and conditions in the second half of the 19th century. The National Defence Act 1888 (51 & 52 Vict. c. 31) made it liable to serve anywhere in the country, and four years later an annual capitation grant of £1 (equivalent to £139 in 2024) was awarded. However, the force remained largely subject to the terms set by the Yeomanry Act 1804 until the passage of the Militia and Yeomanry Act 1901. The new legislation replaced the right to resign on 14 days' notice with a three-year term of service for new recruits; increased the annual training requirement to 18 days, 14 of which were compulsory; introduced a £3 allowance (equivalent to £417 in 2024) per man and grants of £20 (equivalent to £2,780 in 2024) and £30 (equivalent to £4,170 in 2024) for squadron and regimental stores; reduced duty pay to 5s 6d per day (equivalent to £38 in 2024), compensated for by extra daily allowances for travel, musketry practice, forage during permanent duty, and squadron drills, which in total amounted to an extra 10s 6d (equivalent to £73 in 2024); and introduced a £5 allowance (equivalent to £695 in 2024) for the hire of horses.

The incorporation of the yeomanry into the Territorial Force in 1908 introduced further adjustments. Duty pay was reduced by 1s 2d per day, compensated for by free rations, a messing allowance of 1s per day was introduced and £1 was awarded for reaching a set standard of horsemanship. The new organisation also introduced some significant changes to the terms and conditions, including a four-year term of service and reducing annual camp to fifteen days, eight of which were necessary to gain a certificate of efficiency. The most fundamental change of all, however, was the transfer of administration from the regiments to the newly created County Territorial Associations. These were made responsible for the provision of horses, and relieved the officers of the burden and expense of maintaining the regiments.

== Heritage ==
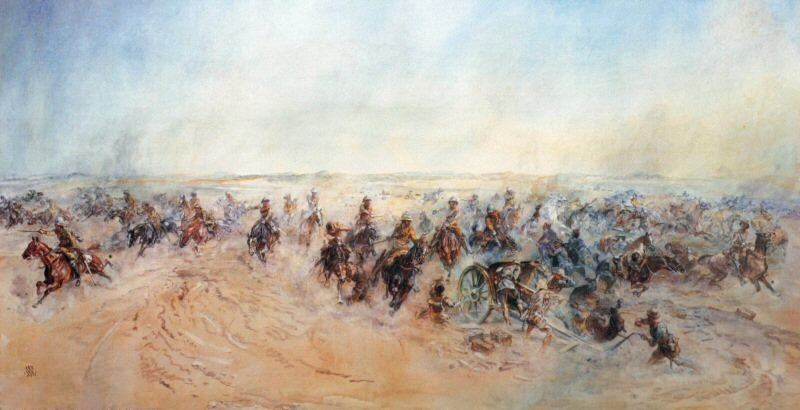
Jerusalem Delivered by Lady Butler, depicting the 1/1st Warwickshire Yeomanry and 1/1st Queen's Own Worcestershire Hussars in one of the British Army's last cavalry charges at Huj.

Yeomanry regiments served overseas during the First World War, in France, at Gallipoli, in Egypt and during the Sinai and Palestine Campaign. The nature of the conflict in Europe precluded the use of mounted forces; cavalry actions were rare, and several regiments finished the war re-purposed as infantry. The same fate befell a number of yeomanry regiments posted to the Middle East, although the yeomanry 2nd Mounted Division, having fought as infantry at Gallipoli, reverted to the cavalry role on its return to Egypt. Being more conducive to mounted operations, the Sinai and Palestine Campaign saw extensive use of the yeomanry, though it often fought dismounted. Some of the last ever cavalry charges conducted by the British Army were made by yeomanry regiments during the campaign, by the 1/1st Warwickshire Yeomanry and 1/1st Queen's Own Worcestershire Hussars in the charge at Huj on 8 November 1917, followed five days later with a charge by the 1/1st Royal Bucks Hussars in the Battle of Mughar Ridge.

In 1921, of the 56 yeomanry regiments active after the First World War, only 14 were retained in the cavalry role, while 16 were disbanded and the remainder converted to either batteries of the Royal Field Artillery or armoured car companies of the Tank Corps. As with previous attempts to relieve the yeomanry of its cavalry role, a number of regiments resisted the change, concerned that the new roles would result at best in an unacceptable change to the unique character of the force and at worst wholesale resignations. Political lobbying succeeded only in increasing the number of regiments to be retained from the originally proposed ten.

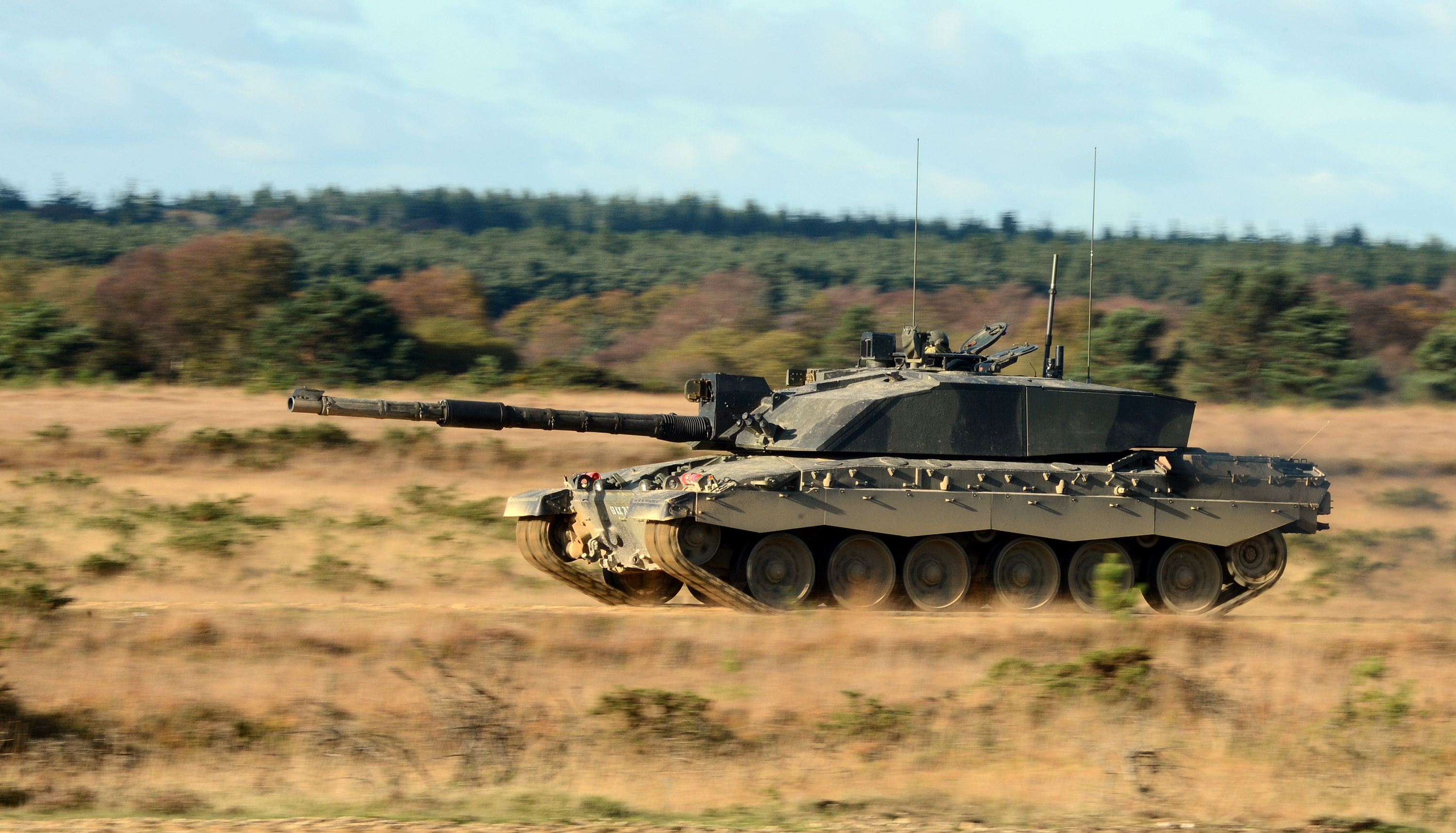
Challenger 2 tank of the Royal Wessex Yeomanry, one of four regiments which preserve the yeomanry heritage in the 21st century.

The yeomanry saw active service during the Second World War in armour, artillery, anti-aircraft and anti-tank roles. Units fought in Europe during the Battle of France, the Normandy landings and the subsequent campaign in North-West Europe, in North Africa during the Western Desert Campaign, in Italy and against Japanese forces in Singapore and Burma. Yeomanry regiments were also deployed in their traditional cavalry role to Palestine, though by 1941 only three regiments still retained their horses. The last action by British cavalry on horseback was fought on 10 July against Vichy French forces in Syria by the Queen's Own Yorkshire Dragoons, which also had the distinction of being the last regiment on active service in the British Army to give up its horses. Several post-war reorganisations resulted in more disbandments and the reduction of surviving regiments to cadres, leaving only the Royal Yeomanry, which performed an armoured reconnaissance role. In 1971 the cadres were restored to form three new yeomanry infantry regiments, and in the 21st century these were converted to armour-based roles alongside the Royal Yeomanry in the Royal Armoured Corps. The current yeomanry regiments are the Royal Yeomanry, the Queen's Own Yeomanry and the Scottish and North Irish Yeomanry, all in the light armoured reconnaissance role, with the Royal Wessex Yeomanry providing replacement crews for main battle tanks.

== See also ==
- List of Yeomanry Regiments 1908
- List of British Army Yeomanry Regiments converted to Royal Artillery

== Bibliography ==
- Athawes, Peter D. (1994). Yeomanry Wars: The History of the Yeomanry, Volunteer and Volunteer Association Cavalry. A Civilian Tradition from 1794. Aberdeen: Scottish Cultural Press. ISBN 978-1898218029.
- Beckett, Ian Frederick William (2008). Territorials: A Century of Service. Plymouth: DRA Publishing. ISBN 978-0955781315.
- Beckett, Ian Frederick William (2011). Britain's Part-Time Soldiers: The Amateur Military Tradition: 1558–1945. Barnsley, South Yorkshire: Pen & Sword Military. ISBN 978-1848843950.
- Hay, George (2016). "The Yeomanry Cavalry and the Reconstitution of the Territorial Army". War in History. 23 (1): 36–54. doi:10.1177/0968344514536704. S2CID 156787231.
- Hay, George (2017). The Yeomanry Cavalry and Military Identities in Rural Britain, 1815–1914. London: Palgrave Macmillan. ISBN 978-3319655383.
- Mileham, Patrick (1985). "The Stirlingshire Yeomanry Cavalry and the Scottish Radical Disturbances of April 1820". Journal of the Society for Army Historical Research. LXIII (253): 20–30. JSTOR 44229635.
- Mileham, Patrick (1985). "The Stirlingshire Yeomanry Cavalry and the Scottish Radical Disturbances of April 1820 (continued)". Journal of the Society for Army Historical Research. LXIII (254): 104–112. JSTOR 44224358.
- Mileham, Patrick (2003). The Yeomanry Regiments; Over 200 Years of Tradition. Staplehurst: Spellmount. ISBN 978-1862271678.
- Wyndham-Quin, Henry (2005) [First published 1898]. The Yeomanry Cavalry of Gloucestershire and Monmouth (Facsimile ed.). Wormbridge, Herefordshire: Golden Valley Publications. ISBN 978-0954257859.
