= Continuance of Laws Act 1800 =

Act of the Parliament of Great Britain

- Act of Parliament
- Parliament of Great Britain
- Long title: An Act to continue, until the first Day of March one thousand eight hundred and three, an Act made in the thirty-third Year of the Reign of his present Majesty, for establishing Courts of Judicature in the Island of Newfoundland; and to continue until the Expiration of forty Days after the Commencement of the next Session of Parliament, several Laws relating to the Admission of certain Articles of Merchandize in neutral Ships, and the issuing of Orders in Council for that Purpose; to the authorizing his Majesty to make Regulations respecting the Trade to the Cape of Good Hope; and to the enabling his Majesty to permit Goods to be imported into this Kingdom in neutral Ships.
- Citation: 39 & 40 Geo. 3. c. 17
- Territorial extent: Great Britain

Dates
- Royal assent: 19 February 1800
- Commencement: 19 February 1800 (Note: The Acts of Parliament (Commencement) Act 1793.)
- Repealed: 21 August 1871
Other legislation
Amends	See § Continued enactments
Repealed by	Statute Law Revision Act 1871
Relates to	See Expiring laws continuance legislation; Restriction on Cash Payments Act 1802; Restrictions on Cash Payments Act 1803; Restriction on Cash Payments Act 1803; Restriction on Cash Payments Act 1814; Restriction on Cash Payments Act 1815; Restriction on Cash Payments Act 1816; Restriction on Cash Payments Act 1818; Restriction on Cash Payments Act 1819; Resumption of Cash Payments, etc. Act 1819

Status: Repealed

Text of statute as originally enacted

The Continuance of Laws Act 1800 (39 & 40 Geo. 3. c. 17) was an act of the Parliament of Great Britain.

== Background ==
In the United Kingdom, acts of Parliament remain in force until expressly repealed. Many acts of parliament, however, contained time-limited sunset clauses, requiring legislation to revive enactments that had expired or to continue enactments that would otherwise expire.

== Provisions ==
=== Continued enactments ===
Section 1 of the act continued the Restriction on Cash Payments Act 1797 (37 Geo. 3. c. 45), as amended and continued by the Restrictions on Cash Payments Act 1797 (c. 91) and the Restriction on Cash Payments (No. 2) Act 1797 (38 Geo. 3. c. 1), until 1 March 1803.

== Subsequent developments ==
The whole act was repealed by section 1 of, and the schedule to, the Statute Law Revision Act 1871 (34 & 35 Vict. c. 116), which came into force on 21 August 1871.
