= London Docks Act 1828 =

Act of the Parliament of the United Kingdom

London Docks Act 1828 (Note: Section 1 of the London Docks Act 1853 (16 & 17 Vict. c. cvi).)
- Act of Parliament
- Parliament of the United Kingdom
- Long title: An Act to consolidate and amend the several Acts for making the London Docks.
- Citation: 9 Geo. 4. c. cxvi
- Territorial extent: United Kingdom

Dates
- Royal assent: 15 July 1828
- Commencement: 15 July 1828 (Note: The Acts of Parliament (Commencement) Act 1793.)
- Repealed: 1 July 1864 (Note: Section 2 of the London and Saint Katharine Docks Act 1864.)
Other legislation
| Repeals/revokes | See § Repealed enactments |
| Amended by | London Docks Act 1853 |
| Repealed by | London and Saint Katharine Docks Act 1864 |

Status: Repealed

Text of statute as originally enacted

The London Docks Act 1828 (9 Geo. 4. c. cxvi) was an act of the Parliament of the United Kingdom that consolidated and amended the acts relating to the London Docks in Wapping, London.

== Provisions ==
=== Repealed enactments ===
Section 1 of the act repealed 14 enactments, listed in that section. The repeal did not affect any purchase, sale, conveyance, grant, security, act, matter, transaction, proceeding, or other thing already made, done, executed, transacted, commenced, or instituted under any of the repealed acts, which remained as good, valid, and effectual as if those acts had not been repealed.

| Citation | Short title | Description | Extent of repeal |
|---|---|---|---|
| 39 & 40 Geo. 3. c. xlvii | Port of London Improvement Act 1800 | An Act for making Wet Docks, Basins, Cuts, and other Works, for the greater Accommodation and Security of Shipping, Commerce, and Revenue, within the Port of London. | The whole act. |
| 44 Geo. 3. c. ii | Port of London Improvement Act 1804 | An Act for raising a further Sum of Money for carrying into Execution an Act, passed in the Fortieth Year of His present Majesty, for making Wet Docks, Basins, Cuts, and other Works, for the greater Accommodation and Security of Shipping, Commerce, and Revenue, within the Port of London. | The whole act. |
| 44 Geo. 3. c. 100 | London Docks (Warehousing of Goods) Act 1804 | An Act for warehousing Goods within the Limits of certain Docks made under an Act, passed in the Thirty-ninth and Fortieth Year of His present Majesty, intituled "An Act for making Wet Docks, Basins, Cuts, and other Works for the greater Accommodation and Security of Shipping, Commerce, and Revenue within the Port of London;" and to make Regulations relating to the said Docks. | The whole act. |
| 45 Geo. 3. c. lviii | Port of London Improvement Act 1805 | An Act to alter and amend an Act, passed in the Fortieth Year of His present Majesty, for making Wet Docks, Basins, Cuts and other Works, for the greater Accommodation and Security of Shipping, Commerce and Revenue, within the Port of London, and for extending the Powers and Provisions of the said Act. | The whole act. |
| 46 Geo. 3. c. lix | Port of London Improvement and London Dock Company Act 1806 | An Act to alter and amend several Acts, passed in the Fortieth, Forty-fourth, and Forty-fifth Years of His present Majesty, for making Wet Docks, Basins, Cuts and other Works, for the greater Accommodation and Security of Shipping, Commerce and Revenue, within the Port of London, and for other the Purposes in the said Acts mentioned; and for enlarging the Powers thereby granted to the London Dock Company. | The whole act. |
| 47 Geo. 3. Sess. 2. c. v | London Dock Company Act 1807 | An Act to enable the London Dock Company to purchase certain Water Works in the Parishes of Stratford, Westham, Bow, Bromley, Mile End, and Stepney, and other Parishes adjacent; and to amend the several Acts for making Wet Docks and other Works for the Accommodation of Shipping, Commerce, and Revenue within the Port of London. | The whole act. |
| 49 Geo. 3. c. clvi | London Dock Company Act 1809 | An Act to alter and amend several Acts passed in the Fortieth, Forty-fourth, Forty-fifth, Forty-sixth, and Forty-seventh Years of His present Majesty, for making Wet Docks, Basins, Cuts, and other Works, for the greater Accommodation and Security of Shipping, Commerce, and Revenue, within the Port of London, and for other the Purposes therein mentioned relating thereto; and to enlarge the Powers and Authorities by the said Acts granted to the London Dock Company. | The whole act. |
| 50 Geo. 3. c. cli | Port of London (Capital) Act 1810 | An Act for raising a further Sum of Money for carrying into Execution the several Acts passed for making Wet Docks, Basins, Cuts and other Works, for the greater Accommodation and Security of Shipping, Commerce and Revenue, within the Port of London. | The whole act. |
| 51 Geo. 3. c. xlix | London Dock Company's Rates (Wines and Spirits) Act 1811 | An Act for regulating the Rates and Charges to be received by the London Dock Company, upon Wines and Spirits landed and warehoused in the London Docks. | The whole act. |
| 52 Geo. 3. c. cxiv | London Docks Act 1812 | An Act for allowing further Time for the Completion of the Docks, Entrances and other Works and Buildings, belonging to the London Dock Company. | The whole act. |
| 54 Geo. 3. c. xl | London Docks Act 1814 | An Act for enlarging and amending the Powers and Provisions of the several Acts for making the London Docks. | The whole act. |
| 55 Geo. 3. c. iii | Port of London Improvement Act 1815 | An Act to amend the several Acts passed for making Wet Docks, Basins, Cuts and other Works, for the greater Accommodation and Security of Shipping, Commerce and Revenue, within the Port of London; and for raising a further Sum of Money for the Completion of the said Works. | The whole act. |
| 58 Geo. 3. c. lxii | Port of London Improvement Act 1818 | An Act to amend the several Acts passed for making Wet Docks, Basins, Cuts and other Works, for the greater Accommodation and Security of Shipping, Commerce and Revenue, within the Port of London. | The whole act. |
| 4 Geo. 4. c. cxxiv | London Dock Company Act 1823 | An Act to allow further Time for the Completion of the Docks and other Works belonging to the London Dock Company. | The whole act. |

== Subsequent developments ==
The whole act was repealed by section 10 of the London and Saint Katharine Docks Act 1864 (27 & 28 Vict.. c. clxxviii), which came into force on 1 July 1864, subject to savings for specified sections of the act set out in part I of the fourth schedule to that act.
