= Bank Restriction Act 1797 =

Act of the Parliament of Great Britain

Restriction on Cash Payments Act 1797
- Act of Parliament
- Parliament of Great Britain
- Long title: An Act for confirming and continuing for a limited time, the restriction contained in the minute of council of the twenty-fifth of February one thousand seven hundred and ninety-seven, on payments of cash by the bank.
- Citation: 37 Geo. 3. c. 45
- Territorial extent: Great Britain

Dates
- Royal assent: 3 May 1797
- Commencement: 3 May 1797 (Note: The Acts of Parliament (Commencement) Act 1793.)
- Expired: 2 December 1797
- Repealed: 21 August 1871
Other legislation
Amended by	Restrictions on Cash Payments Act 1797; Restriction on Cash Payments (No. 2) Act 1797; Continuance of Laws Act 1800; Restriction on Cash Payments Act 1802; Restrictions on Cash Payments Act 1803; Restriction on Cash Payments Act 1803
Repealed by	Statute Law Revision Act 1871
Relates to	Restriction on Cash Payments Act 1814; Restriction on Cash Payments Act 1815; Restriction on Cash Payments Act 1816; Restriction on Cash Payments Act 1818; Restriction on Cash Payments Act 1819; Resumption of Cash Payments, etc. Act 1819

Status: Repealed

Text of statute as originally enacted

The Bank Restriction Act 1797 (37 Geo. 3. c. 45) was an act of the Parliament of Great Britain which removed the requirement for the Bank of England to convert banknotes into gold. The period lasted until 1821, when convertibility was restored. The period between these two dates is known as the Restriction period.

== Background ==
Before restriction suspended the currency's gold standard, an increasing number of people were trading their banknotes for gold. This, combined with the overprinting of banknotes, meant the Bank of England's gold reserves were shrinking quickly. The timing of the act, which had been under consideration for a few months owing to runs on banks in Newcastle-upon-Tyne, Sunderland, and Durham that had in turn requested monetary support from the Bank of England, was the invasion of Britain on 22–24 February 1797 by French forces in Fishguard. When news of this event, now known as the Battle of Fishguard, became known in London, a much greater run on the Bank of England itself was feared, had a large number of holders of banknotes attempted to convert them into gold when bullion reserves already were heavily reduced. However, because the total face value of the notes in circulation was almost twice the gold reserves held (£10,865,050 of notes, compared to £5,322,010 in bullion), this would have bankrupted the Bank, and Parliament decided to suspend specie payments with immediate effect; this suspension was renewed annually until 1821.

== Reasons for overprinting ==
British banknotes were overprinted by the government of William Pitt the Younger after Britain declared war on revolutionary France in 1793. The Bank Restriction Act released the government from the fear of mass redemption of such convertible banknotes, and by the end of the war in 1814 the banknotes in circulation had a face value of £28.4 million, yet were backed by only £2.2 million of gold. However, by 1821, and with radical economic policies instigated by Sir Robert Peel (the future Prime Minister, acting as Chairman of the Bullion Committee), this situation was reversed, and with £2,295,360 of notes in circulation being backed by £11,233,390 of bullion, the British government resumed "convertibility" on 1 May 1821 (two years ahead of schedule).

== In popular culture ==
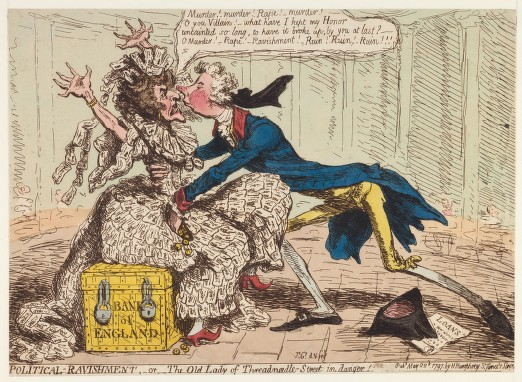
"The Old Lady of Threadneedle St"

After the passing of the act, Richard Brinsley Sheridan publicly bemoaned the way in which the Bank of England had fallen under the influence of William Pitt the Younger by describing the institution as "An elderly lady in the City, of great credit and long standing who had unfortunately fallen into bad company." This in turn led to James Gillray’s famous cartoon entitled Political Ravishment; or the Old Lady of Threadneedle Street in Danger, which depicts Pitt seducing the Bank of England, personified as an old lady attired in £1 and £2 notes, for her fortune. The cartoon's title is the origin of the Bank's nickname of "The Old Lady of Threadneedle Street," still in use today.

== Subsequent developments ==
The act was amended and continued until the end of one month after the start of the next session of parliament by the Restrictions on Cash Payments Act 1797 (37 Geo. 3. c. 91).

Restrictions on Cash Payments Act 1797
- Act of Parliament
- Parliament of Great Britain
- Long title: An act to continue for a limited time, an act, made in this present session of parliament, intituled, "An act for confirming and continuing, for a limited time, the restriction contained in the minute of council of the twenty-sixth day of February one thousand seven hundred and ninety-seven, on payments of cash by the bank, under certain regulations and restrictions."
- Citation: 37 Geo. 3. c. 91
- Territorial extent: Great Britain

Dates
- Royal assent: 22 June 1797
- Commencement: 22 June 1797
- Expired: 2 December 1797
- Repealed: 21 August 1871
Other legislation
Amends	Restriction on Cash Payments Act 1797
Repealed by	Resumption of Cash Payments, etc. Act 1819
Relates to	Restriction on Cash Payments (No. 2) Act 1797; Resumption of Cash Payments, etc. Act 1819; Restriction on Cash Payments Act 1802; Restrictions on Cash Payments Act 1803; Restriction on Cash Payments Act 1803; Restriction on Cash Payments Act 1814; Restriction on Cash Payments Act 1815; Restriction on Cash Payments Act 1816; Restriction on Cash Payments Act 1818; Restriction on Cash Payments Act 1819; Resumption of Cash Payments, etc. Act 1819

Status: Repealed

Text of statute as originally enacted

The act was further amended and continued until one month after the conclusion of the present war by definitive treaty by the Restriction on Cash Payments (No. 2) Act 1797 (38 Geo. 3. c. 1).

Restriction on Cash Payments (No. 2) Act 1797
- Act of Parliament
- Parliament of Great Britain
- Long title: An Act to amend and continue, until one month after the conclusion of the present war, the provisions contained in an act, passed in the session of parliament of the thirty-sixth and thirty-seventh years of his present Majesty, chapter ninety-one, videlicet, on the twenty second of June one thousand seven hundred and ninety-seven, for the restriction on payments of cash by the bank.
- Citation: 38 Geo. 3. c. 1
- Territorial extent: Great Britain

Dates
- Royal assent: 30 November 1797
- Commencement: 30 November 1797
- Repealed: 2 July 1819
Other legislation
Amends	Restriction on Cash Payments Act 1797
Repealed by	Resumption of Cash Payments, etc. Act 1819
Relates to	Restrictions on Cash Payments Act 1797; Continuance of Laws Act 1800; Restriction on Cash Payments Act 1802; Restrictions on Cash Payments Act 1803; Restriction on Cash Payments Act 1803; Restriction on Cash Payments Act 1814; Restriction on Cash Payments Act 1815; Restriction on Cash Payments Act 1816; Restriction on Cash Payments Act 1818; Restriction on Cash Payments Act 1819; Resumption of Cash Payments, etc. Act 1819

Status: Repealed

Text of statute as originally enacted

The act was further continued, as amended, until 1 March 1803 by section 1 of the Continuance of Laws Act 1800 (39 & 40 Geo. 3. c. 17).

The act was further continued until 1 March 1803, as amended, by section 1 of the Restriction on Cash Payments Act 1802 (42 Geo. 3. c. 40).

Restriction on Cash Payments Act 1802
- Act of Parliament
- Parliament of the United Kingdom
- Long title: An Act to continue, until the First Day of March One thousand eight hundred and three, the Restrictions contained in several Acts of the Thirty-seventh and Thirty-eighth Years of the Reign of His present Majesty, on Payments in Cash by the Bank.
- Citation: 42 Geo. 3. c. 40
- Territorial extent: United Kingdom

Dates
- Royal assent: 30 April 1802
- Commencement: 30 April 1802
- Repealed: 6 August 1872
Other legislation
Amends	Restriction on Cash Payments Act 1797
Repealed by	Statute Law Revision Act 1872
Relates to	Restriction on Cash Payments (No. 2) Act 1797; Restrictions on Cash Payments Act 1797; Continuance of Laws Act 1800; Restrictions on Cash Payments Act 1803; Restriction on Cash Payments Act 1803; Restriction on Cash Payments Act 1814; Restriction on Cash Payments Act 1815; Restriction on Cash Payments Act 1816; Restriction on Cash Payments Act 1818; Restriction on Cash Payments Act 1819; Resumption of Cash Payments, etc. Act 1819

Status: Repealed

Text of statute as originally enacted

The act was further amended and continued until 6 weeks after the start of the next session of parliament by the Restrictions on Cash Payments Act 1803 (43 Geo. 3. c. 18).

Restrictions on Cash Payments Act 1803
- Act of Parliament
- Parliament of the United Kingdom
- Long title: An Act to amend and continue, until the Expiration of Six Weeks after the Commencement of the next Session of Parliament, the Restrictions contained in several Acts of the Thirty seventh and Thirty eighth Years of the Reign of His present Majesty, on Payments of Cash by the Bank.
- Citation: 43 Geo. 3. c. 18
- Territorial extent: United Kingdom

Dates
- Royal assent: 28 February 1803
- Commencement: 28 February 1803
- Repealed: 2 July 1819
Other legislation
Amends	Restriction on Cash Payments Act 1797
Repealed by	Resumption of Cash Payments, etc. Act 1819
Relates to	Restriction on Cash Payments (No. 2) Act 1797; Restrictions on Cash Payments Act 1797; Continuance of Laws Act 1800; Restrictions on Cash Payments Act 1802; Restriction on Cash Payments Act 1803; Restriction on Cash Payments Act 1814; Restriction on Cash Payments Act 1815; Restriction on Cash Payments Act 1816; Restriction on Cash Payments Act 1818; Restriction on Cash Payments Act 1819; Resumption of Cash Payments, etc. Act 1819

Status: Repealed

Text of statute as originally enacted

The act was further amended and continued until 6 months after the ratification of a definitive treaty of peace by the Restriction on Cash Payments Act 1803 (44 Geo. 3. c. 1).

Restriction on Cash Payments Act 1803
- Act of Parliament
- Parliament of the United Kingdom
- Long title: An act to continue, until six months after the ratification of a definitive treaty of peace, the restrictions contained in several acts made in the thirty-seventh, thirty-eighth, forty-second, and forty-third years of the reign of his present Majesty, on payments of cash by the bank of England.
- Citation: 44 Geo. 3. c. 1
- Territorial extent: United Kingdom

Dates
- Royal assent: 15 December 1803
- Commencement: 15 December 1803
- Repealed: 6 August 1872
Other legislation
Amends	Restriction on Cash Payments Act 1797
Amended by	Restriction on Cash Payments Act 1814; Restriction on Cash Payments Act 1815; Restriction on Cash Payments Act 1816; Restriction on Cash Payments Act 1818; Restriction on Cash Payments Act 1819
Repealed by	Statute Law Revision Act 1872
Relates to	Restriction on Cash Payments (No. 2) Act 1797; Restrictions on Cash Payments Act 1797; Continuance of Laws Act 1800; Restrictions on Cash Payments Act 1802; Resumption of Cash Payments, etc. Act 1819; Restriction on Cash Payments Act 1803; Restriction on Cash Payments Act 1814; Restriction on Cash Payments Act 1815; Restriction on Cash Payments Act 1816; Restriction on Cash Payments Act 1818; Restriction on Cash Payments Act 1819; Resumption of Cash Payments, etc. Act 1819

Status: Repealed

Text of statute as originally enacted

The act was further continued, as amended, until 25 March 1815 by the Restriction on Cash Payments Act 1814 (54 Geo. 3. c. 99).

Restriction on Cash Payments Act 1814
- Act of Parliament
- Parliament of the United Kingdom
- Long title: An Act to continue, until the Twenty fifth Day of March One thousand eight hundred and fifteen, an Act of the Forty fourth Year of His present Majesty, to continue the Restrictions contained in several Acts of His present Majesty on Payments of Cash by the Bank of England.
- Citation: 54 Geo. 3. c. 99
- Territorial extent: United Kingdom

Dates
- Royal assent: 18 July 1814
- Commencement: 18 July 1814
- Repealed: 5 August 1873
Other legislation
Amends	Restriction on Cash Payments Act 1803
Repealed by	Statute Law Revision Act 1873
Relates to	Restriction on Cash Payments Act 1797Restriction on Cash Payments (No. 2) Act 1797; Restrictions on Cash Payments Act 1797; Continuance of Laws Act 1800; Restrictions on Cash Payments Act 1802; Resumption of Cash Payments, etc. Act 1819; Restriction on Cash Payments Act 1803; Restrictions on Cash Payments Act 1803; Restriction on Cash Payments Act 1815; Restriction on Cash Payments Act 1816; Restriction on Cash Payments Act 1818; Restriction on Cash Payments Act 1819; Resumption of Cash Payments, etc. Act 1819

Status: Repealed

Text of statute as originally enacted

The act was further continued, as amended, until 5 July 1816 by the Restriction on Cash Payments Act 1815 (55 Geo. 3. c. 28).

Restriction on Cash Payments Act 1815
- Act of Parliament
- Parliament of the United Kingdom
- Long title: An Act for further continuing, until the Fifth Day of July One thousand eight hundred and sixteen, an Act of the Forty fourth Year of His present Majesty, to continue the Restrictions contained in the several Acts of His present Majesty on Payments of Cash by the Bank of England.
- Citation: 55 Geo. 3. c. 28
- Territorial extent: United Kingdom

Dates
- Royal assent: 23 March 1815
- Commencement: 23 March 1815
- Repealed: 5 August 1873
Other legislation
Amends	Restriction on Cash Payments Act 1803
Repealed by	Statute Law Revision Act 1873
Relates to	Restriction on Cash Payments Act 1797Restriction on Cash Payments (No. 2) Act 1797; Restrictions on Cash Payments Act 1797; Continuance of Laws Act 1800; Restrictions on Cash Payments Act 1802; Resumption of Cash Payments, etc. Act 1819; Restriction on Cash Payments Act 1803; Restrictions on Cash Payments Act 1803; Restriction on Cash Payments Act 1814; Restriction on Cash Payments Act 1816; Restriction on Cash Payments Act 1818; Restriction on Cash Payments Act 1819; Resumption of Cash Payments, etc. Act 1819

Status: Repealed

Text of statute as originally enacted

The act was further continued, as amended, until 5 July 1818 by the Restriction on Cash Payments Act 1816 (56 Geo. 3. c. 40).

Restriction on Cash Payments Act 1816
- Act of Parliament
- Parliament of the United Kingdom
- Long title: An Act for further continuing, until the Fifth Day of July One thousand eight hundred and eighteen, an Act of the Forty-fourth Year of His present Majesty, to continue the Restrictions contained in the several Acts of His present Majesty, on Payments of Cash by the Bank of England.
- Citation: 56 Geo. 3. c. 40
- Territorial extent: United Kingdom

Dates
- Royal assent: 21 May 1816
- Commencement: 21 May 1816
- Repealed: 5 August 1873
Other legislation
Amends	Restriction on Cash Payments Act 1803
Repealed by	Statute Law Revision Act 1873
Relates to	Restriction on Cash Payments Act 1797Restriction on Cash Payments (No. 2) Act 1797; Restrictions on Cash Payments Act 1797; Continuance of Laws Act 1800; Restrictions on Cash Payments Act 1802; Resumption of Cash Payments, etc. Act 1819; Restriction on Cash Payments Act 1803; Restrictions on Cash Payments Act 1803; Restriction on Cash Payments Act 1814; Restriction on Cash Payments Act 1815; Restriction on Cash Payments Act 1818; Restriction on Cash Payments Act 1819; Resumption of Cash Payments, etc. Act 1819

Status: Repealed

Text of statute as originally enacted

The act was further continued, as amended, until 5 July 1819 by the Restriction on Cash Payments Act 1818 (58 Geo. 3. c. 37).

Restriction on Cash Payments Act 1818
- Act of Parliament
- Parliament of the United Kingdom
- Long title: An Act for further continuing, until the Fifth Day of July One thousand eight hundred and nineteen, an Act of the Forty-fourth Year of His present Majesty, to continue the Restrictions, contained in several Acts of His present Majesty, on Payments of Cash by the Bank of England.
- Citation: 58 Geo. 3. c. 37
- Territorial extent: United Kingdom

Dates
- Royal assent: 28 May 1818
- Commencement: 28 May 1818
- Repealed: 5 August 1873
Other legislation
Amends	Restriction on Cash Payments Act 1803
Repealed by	Statute Law Revision Act 1873
Relates to	Restriction on Cash Payments Act 1797Restriction on Cash Payments (No. 2) Act 1797; Restrictions on Cash Payments Act 1797; Continuance of Laws Act 1800; Restrictions on Cash Payments Act 1802; Resumption of Cash Payments, etc. Act 1819; Restriction on Cash Payments Act 1803; Restrictions on Cash Payments Act 1803; Restriction on Cash Payments Act 1814; Restriction on Cash Payments Act 1815; Restriction on Cash Payments Act 1816; Restriction on Cash Payments Act 1819; Resumption of Cash Payments, etc. Act 1819

Status: Repealed

Text of statute as originally enacted

The act was further continued, as amended, until the end of the present session of parliament by the Restriction on Cash Payments Act 1819 (59 Geo. 3. c. 23).

Restriction on Cash Payments Act 1819
- Act of Parliament
- Parliament of the United Kingdom
- Long title: An Act to restrain, until the End of the present Session of Parliament, the Governor and Company of the Bank of England from making Payments in Cash under certain Notices given by them for that Purpose.
- Citation: 59 Geo. 3. c. 23
- Territorial extent: United Kingdom

Dates
- Royal assent: 6 April 1819
- Commencement: 6 April 1819
- Repealed: 5 August 1873
Other legislation
Amends	Restriction on Cash Payments Act 1803
Amended by	Resumption of Cash Payments, etc. Act 1819
Repealed by	Statute Law Revision Act 1873
Relates to	Restriction on Cash Payments Act 1797Restriction on Cash Payments (No. 2) Act 1797; Restrictions on Cash Payments Act 1797; Continuance of Laws Act 1800; Restrictions on Cash Payments Act 1802; Resumption of Cash Payments, etc. Act 1819; Restriction on Cash Payments Act 1803; Restrictions on Cash Payments Act 1803; Restriction on Cash Payments Act 1814; Restriction on Cash Payments Act 1815; Restriction on Cash Payments Act 1816; Restriction on Cash Payments Act 1819; Resumption of Cash Payments, etc. Act 1819

Status: Repealed

Text of statute as originally enacted

The whole act was repealed by section 1 of, and the schedule to, the Statute Law Revision Act 1871 (34 & 35 Vict. c. 116), which came into force on 21 August 1871.

== See also ==
- Peel's Bill
- Inflation
- Depreciation
