= Peel's Bill =

Act of the Parliament of the United Kingdom

Resumption of Cash Payments, etc. Act 1819
- Act of Parliament
- Parliament of the United Kingdom
- Long title: An act to continue the Restrictions contained in several Acts on Payments in Cash by the Bank of England, until the First Day of May One thousand eight hundred and twenty three, and to provide for the gradual Resumption of such Payments; and to permit the Exportation of Gold and Silver.
- Citation: 59 Geo. 3. c. 49
- Territorial extent: United Kingdom

Dates
- Royal assent: 2 July 1819
- Commencement: 2 July 1819 (Note: The Acts of Parliament (Commencement) Act 1793)
- Expired: 1 May 1823
- Repealed: 5 August 1873
Other legislation
Amends	Restriction on Cash Payments Act 1797; Restriction on Cash Payments Act 1802; Restriction on Cash Payments Act 1803; Restriction on Cash Payments Act 1814; Restriction on Cash Payments Act 1815; Restriction on Cash Payments Act 1816; Restriction on Cash Payments Act 1818; Restriction on Cash Payments Act 1819
Repeals/revokes	Coin Act 1662; Restrictions on Cash Payments Act 1797; Restriction on Cash Payments (No. 2) Act 1797; Restrictions on Cash Payments Act 1803
Repealed by	Statute Law Revision Act 1873
Relates to	Bank Restriction Act 1797

Status: Repealed

Text of statute as originally enacted

Peel's Bill, or the Resumption of Cash Payments Act 1819 (59 Geo. 3. c. 49) was an act of the Parliament of the United Kingdom that marked the return of the British currency to the gold standard, after the Bank Restriction Act 1797 (37 Geo. 3. c. 45) saw paper money replacing convertibility to gold and silver under the financial pressures of the French Revolutionary Wars.

Controversial in its passing, Peel's Bill generated debate and conflict over the decades that followed.

== Antecedents ==
The debate over the return to the gold standard dated back at least to the Bullion Report of 1810, whose recommendations of a return to cash payments within two years were hotly opposed by, among others, Nicholas Vansittart on both theoretical and practical grounds. While the principle of a return to gold became broadly accepted, its implementation was repeatedly postponed, until in 1819 public outrage forced the establishment of a committee to review the matter, chaired by Sir Robert Peel. Initially proclaiming himself a neutral on the matter – "I voted with Van in 1811" – Peel soon swung his weight behind the Bullionist call for a return to what was seen as the sound and honest money of the gold standard.

== Passage ==
Opposition to "Peel's Bill" was widespread among financiers, businessmen, and industrialists alike, who saw it as a potentially deflationary move: among them, perhaps only Manchester's cotton merchants, looking to export more cheaply, were in favour. The landed interest, however, looking to rein in speculation, was strongly in favor of Peel's measure, and the House of Commons accordingly passed it without dissent. A phased return to the gold standard was then set in motion, which was completed by 1821.

== Consequences ==
Following the restoration of convertibility in 1821, there was a stock market bubble and collapse in 1825 which is widely attributed to the return to the gold standard.

Nonetheless, Britain remained on the standard until World War I, something which helped entrench sterling as the global currency of choice throughout the 19th century. However, in the short term, the bill produced a sharply deflationary effect, and falling prices strongly favoured holders of money over borrowers of money: agriculturalists were doubly squeezed, with mortgages costing more in real terms, and produce selling for less. Country gentlemen clamoured for relief, whether from the issuing of small paper notes (briefly tried), by a return to bimetalism, or by a debt restructuring to allow for the changing value of money.

The Radical William Cobbett helped crystallise feeling with his slogan "The farmer versus the fundholder"; the Whig Sir James Graham published a best seller lambasting "an administration, more connected with annuities than land", and the Tory banker Thomas Attwood set up the Birmingham Political Union to reform Parliament and rid it of rentier power exercised through rotten boroughs. Backbench dissatisfaction on the currency question helped bring down the Pittite regime and pass the Great Reform Act, and in 1833 the new Parliament saw an attempt by Attwood, backed by both Radicals and Ultra Tories, to undo the gold standard, narrowly defeated by an alliance of both front benches. A Whig select committee report that same year acknowledged that creditors and those on fixed incomes had gained from resumption of the gold standard at others' expense, but concluded, as Viscount Althorp put it, that while "a gross robbery on the public was committed by Mr. Peel's bill in 1819", its repeal would only constitute "a similar robbery" in reverse.

== Subsequent developments ==
The whole act was repealed by section 1 of, and the schedule to, the Statute Law Revision Act 1873 (36 & 37 Vict. c. 91), which came into force on 5 August 1873.

== See also ==
- Lord Eldon
- Unintended consequences
