= List of acts of the Parliament of Great Britain from 1797 =

This is a complete list of acts of the Parliament of Great Britain for the year 1797.

For acts passed until 1707, see the list of acts of the Parliament of England and the list of acts of the Parliament of Scotland. See also the list of acts of the Parliament of Ireland.

For acts passed from 1801 onwards, see the list of acts of the Parliament of the United Kingdom. For acts of the devolved parliaments and assemblies in the United Kingdom, see the list of acts of the Scottish Parliament, the list of acts of the Northern Ireland Assembly, and the list of acts and measures of Senedd Cymru; see also the list of acts of the Parliament of Northern Ireland.

The number shown after each act's title is its chapter number. Acts are cited using this number, preceded by the year(s) of the reign during which the relevant parliamentary session was held; thus the Union with Ireland Act 1800 is cited as "39 & 40 Geo. 3. c. 67", meaning the 67th act passed during the session that started in the 39th year of the reign of George III and which finished in the 40th year of that reign. Note that the modern convention is to use Arabic numerals in citations (thus "41 Geo. 3" rather than "41 Geo. III"). Acts of the last session of the Parliament of Great Britain and the first session of the Parliament of the United Kingdom are both cited as "41 Geo. 3".

Acts passed by the Parliament of Great Britain did not have a short title; however, some of these acts have subsequently been given a short title by acts of the Parliament of the United Kingdom (such as the Short Titles Act 1896).

From the session 38 Geo. 3 onwards, "public acts" were separated into "public general acts" and "public local and personal acts".

== 37 Geo. 3 ==
Continuing the first session of the 18th Parliament of Great Britain, which met from 27 September 1796 until 20 July 1797.

This session was also traditionally cited as 37 G. 3.

=== Public acts ===
| Short title | Citation | Royal assent |
Long title
| Bank of England Notes under 5l Act 1797 (repealed) | 37 Geo. 3. c. 28 | 3 March 1797 |
An act to remove doubts respecting promissory notes of the governor and company of the bank of England for payment of sums of money under five pounds. (Repealed by Statute Law Revision Act 1861 (24 & 25 Vict. c. 101))
| Bodmin Canal Act 1797 or the Polbrock Canal Act 1797 | 37 Geo. 3. c. 29 | 3 March 1797 |
An act for making and maintaining a navigable canal from Guinea Port, in the parish of St. Breock, in the county of Cornwall, to Dunker Bridge, in the parish of Bodmin, in the said county; and also a certain collateral cut from Cotton Wood, to or near to Ruthern Bridge, in the said parish of Bodmin.
| Grantham Canal Act 1797 | 37 Geo. 3. c. 30 | 3 March 1797 |
An act for enabling the company of proprietors of the Grantham canal navigation to finish and complete the same, and the collateral cut to communicate therewith; and for amending the act of parliament, passed in the thirty-third year of the reign of his present Majesty, (Note: Grantham Canal Act 1793 (33 Geo. 3. c. 94)) for making and maintaining the said canal and collateral cut.
| East India Company (No. 1) Act 1797 (repealed) | 37 Geo. 3. c. 31 | 7 March 1797 |
An act to enable the East India company to raise money by further increasing their capital stock, and to extend the provisions now existing respecting the present stock of the company to the said increased stock. (Repealed by Statute Law Revision Act 1872 (35 & 36 Vict. c. 63))
| Negotiation of Notes and Bills Act 1797 (repealed) | 37 Geo. 3. c. 32 | 10 March 1797 |
An act to suspend, for a limited time, the operation of two acts of the fifteenth (Note: Negotiations of Notes and Bills Act 1775 (15 Geo. 3. c. 51)) and seventeenth (Note: Bills of Exchange Act 1776 (17 Geo. 3. c. 30)) years of the reign of his present Majesty, for restraining the negociation of promissory notes, and inland bills of exchange, under a limited sum, within that part of Great Britain called England. (Repealed by Statute Law Revision Act 1871 (34 & 35 Vict. c. 116))
| Mutiny Act 1797 (repealed) | 37 Geo. 3. c. 33 | 10 March 1797 |
An act for punishing mutiny and desertion; and for the better payment of the army and their quarters. (Repealed by Statute Law Revision Act 1871 (34 & 35 Vict. c. 116))
| Marine Mutiny Act 1797 (repealed) | 37 Geo. 3. c. 34 | 24 March 1797 |
An act for the regulation of his Majesty's marine forces while on shore. (Repealed by Statute Law Revision Act 1871 (34 & 35 Vict. c. 116))
| Land Tax (No. 1) Act 1797 (repealed) | 37 Geo. 3. c. 35 | 24 March 1797 |
An act for appointing commissioners for putting in execution an act of this session of parliament, intituled, "An act for granting an aid to his Majesty by a land tax to be raised in Great Britain for the service of the year one thousand seven hundred and ninety-seven." (Note: Land Tax (No. 2) Act 1796 (37 Geo. 3. c. 2)) (Repealed by Statute Law Revision Act 1871 (34 & 35 Vict. c. 116))
| Caldon Canal Act 1797 (repealed) | 37 Geo. 3. c. 36 | 24 March 1797 |
An act to enable the company of proprietors of the navigation from the Trent to the Mersey, to make a navigable canal from and out of a certain branch of their said navigation, called, The Caldon Canal, at or near Endon, to or near the town of Leek, in the county of Stafford; and also a reservoir for supplying the several canals of the said company with water. (Repealed by Trent and Mersey Navigation Act 1823 (4 Geo. 4. c. lxxxvii) and Trent and Mersey Canal Act 1831 (1 Will. 4. c. lv))
| Trade with United States Act 1797 (repealed) | 37 Geo. 3. c. 37 | 27 March 1797 |
An act to continue the laws now in force for regulating the trade between the subjects of his Majesty's dominions and the inhabitants of the territories belonging to the United States of America so far as the same relate to the trade and commerce carried on between this kingdom and the inhabitants of the countries belonging to the said United States. (Repealed by Statute Law Revision Act 1871 (34 & 35 Vict. c. 116))
| Militia Pay Act 1797 (repealed) | 37 Geo. 3. c. 38 | 27 March 1797 |
An act for defraying the charge of the pay and cloathing of the militia, in that part of Great Britain called England, for the year one thousand seven hundred and ninety-seven. (Repealed by Statute Law Revision Act 1871 (34 & 35 Vict. c. 116))
| Manning of the Army and Navy Act 1797 (repealed) | 37 Geo. 3. c. 39 | 27 March 1797 |
An act to explain and amend an act made in this present session of parliament, intituled, "An act for raising a certain number of men in the several counties, stewartries, royal burghs, and towns, in that part of Great Britain called Scotland, for the service of his Majesty's army and navy." (Note: Manning of the Army and Navy Act 1796 (37 Geo. 3. c. 4)) (Repealed by Statute Law Revision Act 1871 (34 & 35 Vict. c. 116))
| Banks (Scotland) Act 1797 (repealed) | 37 Geo. 3. c. 40 | 27 March 1797 |
An act to allow the banks, and certain banking companies, in that part of Great Britain called Scotland, to issue notes for sums under a certain amount, for a limited time; and for indemnifying all persons who have issued notes for small sums of money in that part of the united kingdom. (Repealed by Statute Law Revision Act 1871 (34 & 35 Vict. c. 116))
| Quartering of Soldiers Act 1797 (repealed) | 37 Geo. 3. c. 41 | 24 April 1797 |
An act for increasing the rates of subsistence to be paid to innkeepers and others on quartering soldiers. (Repealed by Statute Law Revision Act 1871 (34 & 35 Vict. c. 116))
| Northampton (Improvement) Act 1797 (repealed) | 37 Geo. 3. c. 42 | 24 April 1797 |
An act for altering and amending an act, passed in the eighteenth year of the reign of his present Majesty, intituled, "An act for paving, cleansing, lighting and watching, the town of Northampton, and for removing and preventing encroachments, obstructions, and annoyances therein;" (Note: Northampton (Improvement) Act 1778 (18 Geo. 3. c. 79)) and for continuing the term of certain tolls by the said act granted. (Repealed by Northampton Improvement and South Bridge Act 1814 (54 Geo. 3. c. cxciii))
| Plymouth Dock Chapel Act 1797 | 37 Geo. 3. c. 43 | 24 April 1797 |
An act for building a new chapel at Plymouth dock, in the parish of Stoke Damerel, in the county of Devon.
| Ipswich Improvement Act 1797 (repealed) | 37 Geo. 3. c. 44 | 24 April 1797 |
An act for amending and rendering more effectual an act passed in the thirty-third year of the reign of his present Majesty, (Note: Ipswich Improvement Act 1793 (33 Geo. 3. c. 92)) for paving, lighting, cleansing, and otherwise improving the town of Ipswich, in the county of Suffolk, and for removing and preventing encroachments, obstructions, and annoyances therein. (Repealed by Ipswich Improvement Act 1837 (7 Will. 4 & 1 Vict. c. lxxiii))
| Restriction on Cash Payments Act 1797 or the Bank Restriction Act 1797 (repealed) | 37 Geo. 3. c. 45 | 3 May 1797 |
An Act for confirming and continuing for a limited time, the restriction contained in the minute of council of the twenty-fifth of February one thousand seven hundred and ninety-seven, on payments of cash by the bank. (Repealed by Statute Law Revision Act 1871 (34 & 35 Vict. c. 116))
| National Debt Act 1797 (repealed) | 37 Geo. 3. c. 46 | 3 May 1797 |
An act for making certain annuities, created by the parliament of the kingdom of Ireland, transferrable, and the dividends thereon payable, at the bank of England; and for the better security of the proprietors of such annuities, and of the governor and company of the bank of England. (Repealed by Statute Law Revision Act 1870 (33 & 34 Vict. c. 69))
| John Yeldham's Estate Act 1797 (repealed) | 37 Geo. 3. c. 47 | 3 May 1797 |
An act for discharging the estates of John Yeldham, esquire, from certain demands of the crown, upon the conditions therein mentioned. (Repealed by Statute Law (Repeals) Act 1978 (c. 45))
| Tweed Fisheries Act 1797 (repealed) | 37 Geo. 3. c. 48 | 3 May 1797 |
An act for altering, amending, and rendering more effectual two acts, made in the eleventh (Note: Tweed Fisheries Act 1771 (11 Geo. 3. c. 27)) and fifteenth (Note: Tweed Fisheries Act 1775 (15 Geo. 3. c. 46)) years of the reign of his present Majesty, for the regulation and improvement of the fisheries in the river Tweed, and the rivers and streams running into the same, and also within the mouth or entrance of the said river. (Repealed by River Tweed Fisheries Act 1830 (11 Geo. 4 & 1 Will. 4. c. liv))
| Eyemouth Harbour Act 1797 (repealed) | 37 Geo. 3. c. 49 | 3 May 1797 |
An act for repairing, improving, and maintaining the harbour of Eyemouth in the county of Berwick. (Repealed by Eyemouth Harbour Act 1839 (2 & 3 Vict. c. xxxvi))
| Barmouth Harbour Act 1797 | 37 Geo. 3. c. 50 | 3 May 1797 |
An act for repairing, deepening, enlarging, and preserving, the harbour of Barmouth, in the county of Merioneth.
| Leicester Navigation Act 1797 (repealed) | 37 Geo. 3. c. 51 | 3 May 1797 |
An act for enabling the company of proprietors of the Leicester navigation to finish and complete their several works, and to discharge the debts contrasted in the making thereof; and for amending an act passed in the thirty-first year of the reign of his present Majesty, (Note: Leicestershire and Northamptonshire Union Canal Act 1793 (33 Geo. 3. c. 98)) for making the said navigation, and several other works in such acts mentioned. (Repealed by Leicester Navigation Act 1848 (11 & 12 Vict. c. v))
| Fife Roads Act 1797 (repealed) | 37 Geo. 3. c. 52 | 3 May 1797 |
An act for regulating and converting the statute labour in the county of Fife; and for more effectually making and repairing the highways within the said county. (Repealed by Roads and Bridges (Scotland) Act 1878 (41 & 42 Vict. c. 51) and Local Government (Scotland) Act 1889 (52 & 53 Vict. c. 50))
| Navy Pay, etc. Act 1797 (repealed) | 37 Geo. 3. c. 53 | 9 May 1797 |
An act for carrying into execution his Majesty's order in council of the third day of May one thousand seven hundred and ninety-seven, for an increase in pay and provisions to the seamen and marines serving in his Majesty's navy; and to amend so much of an act made in the thirty-fifth year of the reign of his present majesty, (Note: Navy and Marines Act 1795 (35 Geo. 3. c. 28)) as enables petty officers and seamen, non-commissioned officers of marines, and marines, to allot part of their pay for the maintenance of their wives, children, or mothers. (Repealed by Pay of the Navy Act 1830 (11 Geo. 4 & 1 Will. 4. c. 20))
| Gloucester and Berkeley Canal Act 1797 | 37 Geo. 3. c. 54 | 9 May 1797 |
An act for authorising the company of proprietors of the Gloucester and Berkeley canal navigation to vary the line of a certain part of the said canal, so as to render the execution thereof more easy, expeditious, and less expensive; and for altering and amending the act, passed in the thirty-third year of the reign of his present Majesty, (Note: Gloucester and Berkeley Canal Act 1793 (33 Geo. 3. c. 97)) for mailing the said canal.
| Millbrooke Parish Church, Southampton Act 1797 (repealed) | 37 Geo. 3. c. 55 | 9 May 1797 |
An act for taking down and rebuilding the parish church of Milbrooke (Note: Holy Trinity Church, Millbrook.) in the county of Southampton, and for enlarging the church yard of the said parish. (Repealed by Saint Nicholas Millbrook (Southampton) Church (Sale) Act 1939 (2 & 3 Geo. 6. c. xxv))
| Whitney Bridge Act 1797 | 37 Geo. 3. c. 56 | 9 May 1797 |
An act to amend an act made in the twentieth year of the reign of his present Majesty, (Note: Whitney Bridge Act 1780 (20 Geo. 3. c. 27)) for building a bridge across the river Wye, between Whitney and Clifford, in the county of Hereford.
| National Debt (No. 2) Act 1797 (repealed) | 37 Geo. 3. c. 57 | 11 May 1797 |
An act for raising the sum of fourteen millions five hundred thousand pounds by way of annuities. (Repealed by Statute Law Revision Act 1870 (33 & 34 Vict. c. 69))
| Bridgnorth Bridge Act 1797 | 37 Geo. 3. c. 58 | 11 May 1797 |
An act for repairing or rebuilding the bridge over the river Severn, in the town of Bridgnorth, in the county of Salop, and for opening convenient avenues thereto.
| Loan to Emperor of Germany Act 1797 (repealed) | 37 Geo. 3. c. 59 | 25 May 1797 |
An act for guaranteeing the payment of the dividends on a loan of one million six hundred and twenty thousand pounds to the emperor of Germany, and the regular redemption of the capital to be created thereby; for enabling the governor and company of the bank of England to retain the sums granted for repaying advances made by them for the publick service; and for repaying to the contributors to the loans of fourteen millions five hundred thousand pounds, and one million six hundred and twenty thousand pounds, the excess of their deposits beyond the proportional deposits to the said loans. (Repealed by Statute Law Revision Act 1861 (24 & 25 Vict. c. 101))
| Stamps Act 1797 (repealed) | 37 Geo. 3. c. 60 | 25 May 1797 |
An act to amend an act, made in the thirty-fourth year of the reign of his present Majesty, intituled, "An act for granting to his Majesty certain stamp duties on indentures of clerkships to solicitors and attornies in any of the courts in England therein mentioned." (Note: Stamps (No. 3) Act 1794 (34 Geo. 3. c. 14)) (Repealed by Statute Law Revision Act 1871 (34 & 35 Vict. c. 116))
| Negotiation of Notes and Bills (No. 2) Act 1797 (repealed) | 37 Geo. 3. c. 61 | 25 May 1797 |
An act to revive, amend, and continue, for a limited time, an act passed in the present session of parliament, intituled, "An act to suspend, for a limited time, the operation of two acts of the fifteenth and seventeenth years of the reign of his present Majesty, for restraining the negociation of promissory notes and inland bills of exchange, under a limited sum, within that part of Great Britain called England." (Note: Negotiation of Notes and Bills Act 1797 (37 Geo. 3. c. 32)) (Repealed by Statute Law Revision Act 1871 (34 & 35 Vict. c. 116))
| Banks (Scotland) (No. 2) Act 1797 (repealed) | 37 Geo. 3. c. 62 | 25 May 1797 |
An act to revive and continue, for a limited time, and amend an act, passed in the present session of parliament, intituled, "An act to allow the banks, and certain banking companies, in that part of Great Britain called Scotland, to issue notes for sums under a certain amount, for a limited time; and for indemnifying all persons who have issued notes for small sums of money in that part of the united kingdom." (Note: Banks (Scotland) Act 1797 (37 Geo. 3. c. 40)) (Repealed by Statute Law Revision Act 1871 (34 & 35 Vict. c. 116))
| Foreign Ships Act 1797 (repealed) | 37 Geo. 3. c. 63 | 25 May 1797 |
An act for granting to foreign ships put under his Majesty's protection, the privileges of prize ships, under certain regulations and restrictions; and for allowing aliens in foreign colonies surrendered to his Majesty, to exercise the occupations of merchants or factors. (Repealed by Statute Law Revision Act 1861 (24 & 25 Vict. c. 101))
| Indemnity to Governors of West Indies Act 1797 (repealed) | 37 Geo. 3. c. 64 | 25 May 1797 |
An act for indemnifying governors, lieutenant governors, and persons acting as such, in the West India islands, who have permitted the importation and exportation of goods and commodities in foreign bottoms. (Repealed by Statute Law Revision Act 1871 (34 & 35 Vict. c. 116))
| Middlesex County Rates Act 1797 (repealed) | 37 Geo. 3. c. 65 | 25 May 1797 |
An act for empowering the justices of the peace for the county of Middlesex, at their general or quarter sessions of the peace, to make a fair and equal county rate for the said county. (Repealed by Middlesex County Rates Act 1831 (1 Will. 4. c. xlviii) and County Rates Act 1852 (15 & 16 Vict. c. 81))
| Kent Fortifications Act 1797 | 37 Geo. 3. c. 66 | 25 May 1797 |
An act for revesting certain lands, tenements and hereditaments, in the county of Kent, in the former proprietors thereof, and for other purposes therein mentioned.
| Lincoln Drainage Act 1797 (repealed) | 37 Geo. 3. c. 67 | 25 May 1797 |
An act to embank and drain the open and unembanked lands and grounds lying between The Dales Head Dyke and the river Witham, in the several townships or hamlets and parishes of Walcot, Timberland, Thorpe, Timberland, Martin, Linwood, and Blankney, all in the county of Lincoln. (Repealed by Lincolnshire Fens and Dales Drainage Act 1832 (2 & 3 Will. 4. c. xciv), Timberland and Timberland Thorpe (Lincolnshire) Drainage Act 1839 (2 & 3 Vict. c. x) and Lincolnshire Drainage Act 1840 (3 & 4 Vict. c. xc))
| Whittlesey Drainage Act 1797 | 37 Geo. 3. c. 68 | 25 May 1797 |
An act for charging the fen lands and low grounds within the second, third, fourth, and fifth districts, in the bounds and precincts of Whittlesey in the Isle of Ely, and county of Cambridge, with further taxes for discharging the debts incurred by the commissioners for the said districts respectively, under certain acts passed in the twenty-second year of King George the Second, (Note: Isle of Ely Drainage (No. 2) Act 1748 (22 Geo. 2. c. 19)) and in the twelfth year of his present Majesty; (Note: Drainage (Isle of Ely) Act 1772 (12 Geo. 3. c. 27)) and for better improving, supporting, and preserving, the drainage of the said lands and grounds.
| Taxes Act 1797 (repealed) | 37 Geo. 3. c. 69 | 6 June 1797 |
An act for granting to his Majesty additional duties on the amount of certain duties under the management of the commissioners for the affairs of taxes. (Repealed by Statute Law Revision Act 1861 (24 & 25 Vict. c. 101))
| Incitement to Mutiny Act 1797 (repealed) | 37 Geo. 3. c. 70 | 6 June 1797 |
An Act for the better Prevention and Punishment of Attempts to seduce Persons serving in His Majesty’s Forces by Sea or Land from their Duty and Allegiance to His Majesty, or to incite them to Mutiny or Disobedience. (Repealed by Statute Law (Repeals) Act 1998 (c. 43))
| Certain Mutinous Crews Act 1797 (repealed) | 37 Geo. 3. c. 71 | 6 June 1797 |
An Act for more effectually restraining Intercourse with the Crews of certain of His Majesty's Ships now in a State of Mutiny and Rebellion and for the more effectual Suppression of such Mutiny and Rebellion. (Repealed by Statute Law Revision Act 1871 (34 & 35 Vict. c. 116))
| Importation Act 1797 (repealed) | 37 Geo. 3. c. 72 | 6 June 1797 |
An act for prohibiting the importation of cambricks and French lawns into this kingdom, not being of the manufacture of Ireland, except for the purpose of being warehoused for exportation. (Repealed by Statute Law Revision Act 1871 (34 & 35 Vict. c. 116))
| Desertion of Seamen Act 1797 (repealed) | 37 Geo. 3. c. 73 | 6 June 1797 |
An act for preventing the desertion of seamen from British merchant ships trading to his Majesty's colonies and plantations in the West Indies. (Repealed by Merchant Seamen Act 1835 (5 & 6 Will. 4. c. 19))
| East India Company (No. 2) Act 1797 (repealed) | 37 Geo. 3. c. 74 | 6 June 1797 |
An act to enable the East India company to pay the expences of two regiments of infantry to be raised for the defence and protection of the house and warehouses of the said company, and for such publick services as are mentioned in an act made in the thirty-fourth year of the reign of his present Majesty, intituled, "An act for encouraging and disciplining such corps or companies of men as shall voluntarily enroll themselves for the defence of their counties, towns, or coasts, or for the general defence of the kingdom, during the present war." (Note: Volunteer Corps Act 1794 (34 Geo. 3. c. 31)) (Repealed by Statute Law Revision Act 1871 (34 & 35 Vict. c. 116))
| Tower Hamlets Militia Act 1797 (repealed) | 37 Geo. 3. c. 75 | 6 June 1797 |
An act to enable hit Majesty to draw out and embody the militia forces of the Tower Hamlets, in the county of Middlesex. (Repealed by Statute Law Revision Act 1871 (34 & 35 Vict. c. 116))
| Bounty on Exportation Act 1797 (repealed) | 37 Geo. 3. c. 76 | 6 June 1797 |
An act for disallowing the bounty on the exportation to Iceland of sail cloth or canvas of the manufacture of Great Britain, for a limited time. (Repealed by Statute Law Revision Act 1871 (34 & 35 Vict. c. 116))
| Free Ports Act 1797 (repealed) | 37 Geo. 3. c. 77 | 6 June 1797 |
An act for making the port of San Josef, in the island of Trinidad a freeport. (Repealed by Statute Law Revision Act 1861 (24 & 25 Vict. c. 101))
| Pilots Liverpool Act 1797 (repealed) | 37 Geo. 3. c. 78 | 6 June 1797 |
An act for the better regulation and encouragement of pilots for the conducting of ships and vessels into and out of the port of Liverpool. (Repealed by Liverpool Port Pilotage Act 1824 (5 Geo. 4. c. lxxiii))
| Stepney Improvements, Poor Relief Act 1797 (repealed) | 37 Geo. 3. c. 79 | 6 June 1797 |
An act to amend and render more effectual an act, passed in the twenty-sixth year of the reign of his late majesty King George the Second, intituled, "An act more effectually to enable the parishioners of the parish of Christ Church, in the county of Middlesex, to purchase, hire, or erect a workhouse for the employing and maintaining the poor of the said parish, and for the more effectual support and employment of the poor therein;" (Note: Christchurch, Stepney (Poor Relief) Act 1753 (26 Geo. 2. c. 98)) and also an act, passed in the eighteenth year of his present Majesty's reign, (Note: Christchurch, Stepney (Poor Relief, etc.) Act 1778 (18 Geo. 3. c. 74)) for amending the said first mentioned act; and for enlarging the powers of the said acts, and altering the manner of rating to the poor of the said parish, and better effectuating other regulations relative thereto. (Repealed by London Government (Borough of Stepney) Order in Council 1901 (SR&O 1901/276))
| Saint Pancras Improvements, etc. Act 1797 (repealed) | 37 Geo. 3. c. 80 | 6 June 1797 |
An act for paving, cleansing, lighting, watching, and otherwise improving, all such streets and other publick passages, as are or shall be made upon a certain piece of ground, belonging to Elizabeth Doughty, spinster, situate in the parish of St. Pancras, in the county of Middlesex. (Repealed by London Government (Borough of St. Pancras) Order in Council 1901 (SR&O 1901/274))
| Trent and Mersey Canal Act 1797 (repealed) | 37 Geo. 3. c. 81 | 6 June 1797 |
An act to enable the company of proprietors of the navigation from the Trent to the Mersey, to extend several branches of the canal from and out of their said navigation. (Repealed by Trent and Mersey Navigation Act 1823 (4 Geo. 4. c. lxxxvii) and Trent and Mersey Canal Act 1831 (1 Will. 4. c. lv))
| Subscriptions to Loan Act 1797 (repealed) | 37 Geo. 3. c. 82 | 19 June 1797 |
An act for allowing certain discounts to the contributors of eighteen millions raised by annuities by an act of the present session of parliament, who shall have completed their contributions on or before the days therein mentioned. (Repealed by Statute Law Revision Act 1871 (34 & 35 Vict. c. 116))
| Exportation and Importation Act 1797 (repealed) | 37 Geo. 3. c. 83 | 19 June 1797 |
An act to repeal so much of an act, passed in the present session of parliament, (Note: Exportation and Importation Act 1796 (37 Geo. 3. c. 7)) as prohibits the exportation and permits the importation, duty free, of several sorts of corn, and other articles made thereof. (Repealed by Statute Law Revision Act 1871 (34 & 35 Vict. c. 116))
| Importation (No. 2) Act 1797 (repealed) | 37 Geo. 3. c. 84 | 19 June 1797 |
An act to permit goods, the product or manufacture of certain places within the Levant or Mediterranean Seas, to be imported into Great Britain, in British or foreign vessels, from any place whatsoever, for a limited time. (Repealed by Statute Law Revision Act 1871 (34 & 35 Vict. c. 116))
| Relief of Prisoners Act 1797 (repealed) | 37 Geo. 3. c. 85 | 19 June 1797 |
An act to amend so much of an act, made in the thirty-second year of the reign of King George the Second, intituled, "An act for the relief of debtors with respect to the imprisonment of their persons; and to oblige debtors, who shall continue in execution in prison beyond a certain time, and for sums not exceeding what are mentioned in the act, to make discovery of, and deliver upon oath, their estates for their creditors benefit," (Note: Debtors Imprisonment Act 1758 (32 Geo. 2. c. 28)) as relates to the weekly sums thereby directed to be paid to prisoners in execution for debt, in the cases therein mentioned. (Repealed by Statute Law Revision Act 1871 (34 & 35 Vict. c. 116))
| Ramsgate Harbour Act 1797 | 37 Geo. 3. c. 86 | 19 June 1797 |
An act for amending an act, passed in the thirty-second year of the reign of his present Majesty, intituled, "An act for the maintenance and improvement of the harbour of Ramsgate, in the county of Kent; and for cleansing, amending, and preserving, the haven of Sandwich in the same county." (Note: Ramsgate Harbour and Sandwich Act 1792 (32 Geo. 3. c. 74))
| Great Tower Hill Improvement Act 1797 (repealed) | 37 Geo. 3. c. 87 | 19 June 1797 |
An act for paving, lighting, watching, cleansing, watering, improving, and keeping in repair, Great Tower Hill; and for removing and preventing nuisances and annoyances within the same. (Repealed by Borough of Stepney (Tower of London) Scheme 1901 (SR&O 1901/540))
| Waterbeach Level Drainage Act 1797 | 37 Geo. 3. c. 88 | 19 June 1797 |
An act to alter, amend, and render more effectual, an act made in the fourteenth year of the reign of his late majesty King George the Second, intituled, "An act for the effectual draining and preservation of Waterbeach Level, in the county of Cambridge, and to establish an agreement made between the lord of the manor of Waterbeach cum Denny, and the commoners within the said manor; and also to raise a further sum of money for the improvement and security of the said level." (Note: Waterbeach Level Drainage Act 1740 (14 Geo. 2. c. 24))
| Burnt Fen (Northampton) Drainage Act 1797 (repealed) | 37 Geo. 3. c. 89 | 19 June 1797 |
An act to amend and render more effectual an act, made in the thirty-third year of his late majesty King George the Second, intituled, "An act for draining and preserving certain fen lands and low grounds in the Isle of Ely and counties of Suffolk and Norfolk, between Mildenhall river south, Plant Load and Brandon river north, bounded on the west by the river Ouse, and on the east by Winter Load, Earswell Brook, and the Hard Lands of Mildenhall; and for empowering the governor, bailiffs, and commonalty of the company of conservators of the great level of the fens, commonly called Bedford Level, to sell certain fen lands, lying within the limits aforesaid, commonly called Invested Lands," (Note: Isle of Ely, Suffolk, Norfolk Drainage Act 1759 (33 Geo. 2. c. 32)) so far as relates to the several fen lands and low grounds lying in the first district described in the said act; and also to amend and render more effectual an act, passed in the thirteenth year of the reign of his present Majesty, (Note: Bedford Level (Drainage) Act 1772 (13 Geo. 3. c. 40)) for amending and rendering more effectual the said first recited act. (Repealed by Isle of Ely (Mildenhall River) Drainage Act 1807 (47 Geo. 3 Sess. 2 c. lxxxiii))
| Stamps (No. 2) Act 1797 (repealed) | 37 Geo. 3. c. 90 | 22 June 1797 |
An act for granting to his Majesty certain stamp duties on the several matters therein mentioned, and for better securing the duties on certificates to be taken out by solicitors, attornies, and others, practising in certain courts of justice in Great Britain. (Repealed by Inland Revenue Repeal Act 1870 (33 & 34 Vict. c. 99))
| Restrictions on Cash Payments Act 1797 (repealed) | 37 Geo. 3. c. 91 | 22 June 1797 |
An act to continue for a limited time, an act, made in this present session of parliament, intituled, "An act for confirming and continuing, for a limited time, the restriction contained in the minute of council of the twenty-sixth day of February one thousand seven hundred and ninety-seven, on payments of cash by the bank, under certain regulations and restrictions." (Note: Restriction on Cash Payments Act 1797 (37 Geo. 3. c. 45)) (Repealed by Resumption of Cash Payments, etc. Act 1819 (59 Geo. 3. c. 49))
| Aliens Act 1797 (repealed) | 37 Geo. 3. c. 92 | 22 June 1797 |
An act to continue for a limited time an act, made in the thirty-third year of his present Majesty's reign, intituled, "An act for establishing regulations respecting aliens arriving in this kingdom, or resident therein, in certain cases." (Note: Aliens Act 1793 (33 Geo. 3. c. 4)) (Repealed by Statute Law Revision Act 1871 (34 & 35 Vict. c. 116))
| Indemnity Act 1797 (repealed) | 37 Geo. 3. c. 93 | 22 June 1797 |
An act to indemnify such persons as have omitted to obtain their certificates of enrolment, admission, or registry, in the several courts of this kingdom. (Repealed by Statute Law Revision Act 1871 (34 & 35 Vict. c. 116))
| Bounty on Pilchards Act 1797 (repealed) | 37 Geo. 3. c. 94 | 22 June 1797 |
An act to continue an act, made in the thirty-first year of the reign of his present Majesty, intituled, "An act for the encouragement of the pilchard fishery, by allowing a further bounty upon pilchards taken cured and exported." (Note: Pilchard Fisheries Act 1791 (31 Geo. 3. c. 45)) (Repealed by Sea Fisheries Act 1868 (31 & 32 Vict. c. 45))
| Hampshire and Wiltshire Fisheries Act 1797 (repealed) | 37 Geo. 3. c. 95 | 22 June 1797 |
An act to amend two acts made in the fourth year of the reign of Queen Anne, (Note: Fish Act 1705 (4 & 5 Ann. c. 8)) and the first year of the reign of King George the First, (Note: Fish Act 1714 (1 Geo. 1. St. 2. c. 18)) for the preservation of salmon and other fish in the rivers within the counties of Southampton and Wilts. (Repealed by Statute Law Revision Act 1871 (34 & 35 Vict. c. 116))
| Isle of Ely Drainage Act 1797 | 37 Geo. 3. c. 96 | 22 June 1797 |
An act for amending and rendering more effectual an act, passed in the thirteenth year of his late majesty King George the First, intituled, "An act for the effectual draining and preservation of Haddenham Level in the Isle of Ely; and for more effectually draining and preserving the fen lands and low grounds lying within the said Level." (Note: Drainage (Haddenham Level) Act 1726 (13 Geo. 1. c. 18))
| Treaty with United States Act 1797 (repealed) | 37 Geo. 3. c. 97 | 4 July 1797 |
An act for carrying into execution the treaty of amity, commerce, and navigation, concluded between his Majesty and the united states of America. (Repealed by Statute Law Revision Act 1871 (34 & 35 Vict. c. 116))
| Assise and Making of Bread, London Act 1797 (repealed) | 37 Geo. 3. c. 98 | 4 July 1797 |
An act to amend and render more effectual an act, made in the thirty-first year of the reign of his late majesty King George the Second, intituled, "An act for the due making of bread, and to regulate the price and assize thereof, and to punish persons who shall adulterate meal, flour, or bread," (Note: Making of Bread Act 1757 (31 Geo. 2. c. 29)) so far as the same relates to the assize and making of bread to be sold in the city of London, and the liberties thereof, and within the weekly bills of mortality, and within ten miles of the Royal Exchange. (Repealed by London Bread Trade Act 1815 (55 Geo. 3. c. xcix))
| Continuance of Laws Act 1797 (repealed) | 37 Geo. 3. c. 99 | 4 July 1797 |
An Act to revive and continue the bounties granted by an Act, made in the twenty-sixth Year of the Reign of His present Majesty, (Note: Newfoundland Fisheries Act 1786 (26 Geo. 3. c. 26)) for encouraging the Fisheries carried on at Newfoundland and Parts adjacent, from Great Britain, Ireland, and the British dominions in Europe; to continue so much of an Act, made in the thirty-third Year of the Reign of His present Majesty, (Note: Importation and Exportation Act 1793 (33 Geo. 3. c. 50)) as permits the Importation and Exportation of certain Goods, Wares, and Merchandizes, in Foreign Ships, into and from the Port of Saint John's in the Island of Antigua; and so much of an Act, made in the thirty-third Year of the Reign of his present Majesty, (Note: Excise Act 1793 (33 Geo. 3. c. 59)) as permits Sir William Bishop, George Bishop, and Argles Bishop, to carry on the Manufacture of Maidstone Geneva; and also so much of an Act made in the thirty-fifth Year of the Reign of his present Majesty, (Note: Duties on Glass Act 1795 (35 Geo. 3. c. 114)) for better securing the Duties on Glass, as was to continue for a limited Time. (Repealed by Statute Law Revision Act 1871 (34 & 35 Vict. c. 116))
| Monmouthshire Canal Navigation Act 1797 | 37 Geo. 3. c. 100 | 4 July 1797 |
An act for extending the Monmouthshire canal navigation; and for explaining an act, passed is the thirty-second year of the reign of his present Majesty, (Note: Monmouthshire Canal Navigation Act 1792 (32 Geo. 3. c. 102)) for making the said canal.
| Aberdeen Harbour Act 1797 or the Aberdeen Harbour Improvement Act 1797 (repealed) | 37 Geo. 3. c. 101 | 4 July 1797 |
An act for enlarging and improving the harbour of Aberdeen, for building new quays, wharfs, and docks, and for making new roads and passages, and widening others leading to and from the said harbour. (Repealed by Aberdeen Harbour Act 1829 (10 Geo. 4. c. xxxiv))
| Scotch Distilleries Act 1797 (repealed) | 37 Geo. 3. c. 102 | 19 July 1797 |
An act for granting to his Majesty additional duties on distilleries in the several parts of the highlands of Scotland herein particularly described, for a limited time; and for regulating the duties on distillers in the respective districts in Scotland. (Repealed by Statute Law Revision Act 1861 (24 & 25 Vict. c. 101))
| Militia Act 1797 (repealed) | 37 Geo. 3. c. 103 | 19 July 1797 |
An act to raise and embody a militia force in that part of the kingdom of Great Britain called Scotland. (Repealed by Statute Law Revision Act 1871 (34 & 35 Vict. c. 116))
| Slave Trade Act 1797 (repealed) | 37 Geo. 3. c. 104 | 19 July 1797 |
An act for regulating the shipping and carrying of slaves in British vessels from the coast of Ahicz. (Repealed by Statute Law Revision Act 1871 (34 & 35 Vict. c. 116))
| House Duties Act 1797 (repealed) | 37 Geo. 3. c. 105 | 19 July 1797 |
An act for granting to his Majesty several additional duties on inhabited bouses. (Repealed by Statute Law Revision Act 1861 (24 & 25 Vict. c. 101))
| Duties on Horses Act 1797 (repealed) | 37 Geo. 3. c. 106 | 19 July 1797 |
An act for granting to his Majesty additional duties on certain horses, before charged with a duty of two shillings by an act of the thirty-sixth year of his present Majesty's reign, (Note: Duties on Horses Act 1795 (36 Geo. 3. c. 15)) and on mules. (Repealed by House Tax Act 1803 (43 Geo. 3. c. 161))
| Duties on Servants Act 1797 (repealed) | 37 Geo. 3. c. 107 | 19 July 1797 |
An all for granting to his Majesty additional duties on male servants. (Repealed by House Tax Act 1803 (43 Geo. 3. c. 161))
| Duties on Clocks and Watches Act 1797 (repealed) | 37 Geo. 3. c. 108 | 19 July 1797 |
An Act for granting to his Majesty certain duties on clocks and watches. (Repealed by Statute Law Revision Act 1861 (24 & 25 Vict. c. 101))
| Manning of the Navy, etc. Act 1797 (repealed) | 37 Geo. 3. c. 109 | 19 July 1797 |
An act to amend an act, made in the thirty-third year of the reign of his present Majesty, intituled, "An act for the encouragement of seamen, and for the better and more effectually manning his Majesty's navy;" (Note: Manning of the Navy, etc. Act 1793 (33 Geo. 3. c. 66)) and for making further provision for those purposes. (Repealed by Naval Prize Acts Repeal Act 1864 (27 & 28 Vict. c. 23))
| Customs Act 1797 (repealed) | 37 Geo. 3. c. 110 | 19 July 1797 |
An act for granting to his Majesty additional duties of customs on certain goods, wares, and merchandize, imported into, exported from, or carried coastwise; and on pepper to be used and consumed in this kingdom. (Repealed by Statute Law Revision Act 1861 (24 & 25 Vict. c. 101))
| Stamps (No. 3) Act 1797 (repealed) | 37 Geo. 3. c. 111 | 19 July 1797 |
An act for granting to his Majesty an additional stamp duty on deeds. (Repealed by Statute Law Revision Act 1861 (24 & 25 Vict. c. 101))
| Relief of Insolvent Debtors Act 1797 (repealed) | 37 Geo. 3. c. 112 | 19 July 1797 |
An act for the relief of certain insolvent debtors. (Repealed by Statute Law Revision Act 1871 (34 & 35 Vict. c. 116))
| Lottery Act 1797 (repealed) | 37 Geo. 3. c. 113 | 19 July 1797 |
An act for granting to his Majesty a certain sum of money, to he raised by a lottery. (Repealed by Statute Law Revision Act 1871 (34 & 35 Vict. c. 116))
| Loans or Exchequer Bills Act 1797 (repealed) | 37 Geo. 3. c. 114 | 19 July 1797 |
An act for raising a certain sum of money, by loans or exchequer bills, for the service of the year one thousand seven hundred and ninety-seven. (Repealed by Statute Law Revision Act 1871 (34 & 35 Vict. c. 116))
| National Debt (No. 3) Act 1797 (repealed) | 37 Geo. 3. c. 115 | 19 July 1797 |
An act for granting to his Majesty the sum of two hundred thousand pounds, to be issued and paid to the governor and company of the bank of England, to be by them placed to the account of the commissioners for the reduction of the national debt. (Repealed by Statute Law Revision Act 1861 (24 & 25 Vict. c. 101))
| Militia Allowances Act 1797 (repealed) | 37 Geo. 3. c. 116 | 19 July 1797 |
An act for making allowances in certain cases to subaltern officers of the militia in time of peace. (Repealed by Statute Law Revision Act 1871 (34 & 35 Vict. c. 116))
| Trade with India Act 1797 (repealed) | 37 Geo. 3. c. 117 | 19 July 1797 |
An act for regulating the trade to be carried on with the British possessions in India, by the ships of nations in amity with his Majesty, (Repealed by Navigation Act 1849 (12 & 13 Vict. c. 29))
| Slave Trade (No. 2) Act 1797 (repealed) | 37 Geo. 3. c. 118 | 19 July 1797 |
An act for regulating the height between decks of vessels entered outwards for the purpose of carrying slaves from the coast of Africa. (Repealed by Statute Law Revision Act 1861 (24 & 25 Vict. c. 101))
| Negroes Act 1797 (repealed) | 37 Geo. 3. c. 119 | 19 July 1797 |
An act to repeal so much of an act made in the fifth year of the reign of his late majesty King George the Second, intitled, "An act for the more easy recovery of debts in his Majesty's plantations and colonies in America," (Note: Recovery of Debts in American Plantations Act 1731 (5 Geo. 2. c. 7)) as makes negroes chattels for the payment of debts. (Repealed by Statute Law Revision Act 1871 (34 & 35 Vict. c. 116))
| Negotiations of Bills and Notes Act 1797 (repealed) | 37 Geo. 3. c. 120 | 19 July 1797 |
An act further to continue an act, made in this present session of parliament, intituled, "An act to suspend, for a limited time, the operation of two acts of the fifteenth and seventeenth years of the reign of his present Majesty, for restraining the negociation of promissory notes and inland bills of exchange, under a limited sum, within that part of Great Britain called England;" as revived, amended, and continued, by a subsequent act of this session, (Note: Negotiation of Notes and Bills (No. 2) Act 1797 (37 Geo. 3. c. 61)) passed for the purpose of reviving, amending, and continuing the same; and also for continuing such subsequent act. (Repealed by Statute Law Revision Act 1871 (34 & 35 Vict. c. 116))
| Southern Whale Fisheries Act 1797 (repealed) | 37 Geo. 3. c. 121 | 19 July 1797 |
An act to explain an act passed in the thirty-fifth year of his present Majesty's reign, intituled, "An act for further encouraging and regulating the southern whale fisheries." (Note: Southern Whale Fisheries Act 1795 (35 Geo. 3. c. 92)) (Repealed by Statute Law Revision Act 1861 (24 & 25 Vict. c. 101))
| Forgery Act 1797 (repealed) | 37 Geo. 3. c. 122 | 19 July 1797 |
An act for the better preventing the forging or counterfeiting the names of witnesses to letters of attorney, or other authorities or instruments, for the transfer of stocks or funds, which now are, or by any act or acts of parliament shall hereafter be made, transferrable at the bank of England; or for the transfer of any part of the capital Stock of the governor and company of the bank of England called Bank Stock; or for the transfer of any part of the capital stock, or any stocks or funds under the management of the South Sea company; or for the transfer of any part of the capital stock of the East India company; or for the receipt of dividends upon any of such stocks or funds. (Repealed by Statute Law Revision Act 1870 (33 & 34 Vict. c. 69))
| Unlawful Oaths Act 1797 (repealed) | 37 Geo. 3. c. 123 | 19 July 1797 |
An act for more effectually preventing the administering or taking of unlawful oaths. (Repealed by Statute Law (Repeals) Act 1981 (c. 19))
| Bankrupts Act 1797 (repealed) | 37 Geo. 3. c. 124 | 19 July 1797 |
An act to make perpetual an act passed in the fifth year of the reign of his late Majesty, intituled, "An act to prevent the committing of frauds by bankrupts." (Note: Bankrupts Act 1731 (5 Geo. 2. c. 30)) (Repealed by Statute Law Revision Act 1861 (24 & 25 Vict. c. 101))
| Exportation Act 1797 (repealed) | 37 Geo. 3. c. 125 | 19 July 1797 |
An act for authorising his Majesty to permit the exportation of an additional quantity of wheat, wheat meal, or flour, rye, barley, or malt, or bread, biscuit, or pease, to the islands of Guernsey, Jersey, and Alderney, for the maintenance and use of the inhabitants of the said islands, for a limited time. (Repealed by Statute Law Revision Act 1871 (34 & 35 Vict. c. 116))
| Counterfeiting Coin Act 1797 (repealed) | 37 Geo. 3. c. 126 | 19 July 1797 |
An act to prevent the counterfeiting any copper coin in this realm made, or to be made, current by proclamation, or any foreign gold or silver coin; and to prevent the bringing into this realm, or uttering, any counterfeit foreign gold or silver coin. (Repealed by Coinage Offences Act 1832 (2 & 3 Will. 4. c. 34) and Criminal Statutes Repeal Act 1861 (24 & 25 Vict. c. 95))
| Meeting of Parliament Act 1797 | 37 Geo. 3. c. 127 | 19 July 1797 |
An Act to shorten the Time now required for giving Notice of the Royal Intention of his Majesty, his Heirs and Successors, that the Parliament shall meet and be holden for the Dispatch of Business, and more effectually to provide for the Meeting of Parliament in the case of a Demise of the Crown.
| Land Tax (No. 2) Act 1797 (repealed) | 37 Geo. 3. c. 128 | 19 July 1797 |
An act for assessing the commissioners of the tax office, and their officers, to the land tax, in the district called offices executed in Westminster hall; notwithstanding the removal of the said tax office into Somerset Place. (Repealed by Statute Law Revision Act 1871 (34 & 35 Vict. c. 116))
| Weymouth Water Supply Act 1797 (repealed) | 37 Geo. 3. c. 129 | 19 July 1797 |
An act for supplying the borough and town of Weymouth and Melcombe Regis, and the parts adjacent, in the county of Dorset, with water. (Repealed by Weymouth Waterworks Act 1855 (18 & 19 Vict. c. cxxxiii))
| Rye Harbour Act 1797 | 37 Geo. 3. c. 130 | 19 July 1797 |
An act for discontinuing the new harbour of Rye, in the county of Sussex, and for repealing several acts relating thereto, and for providing for the discharge of a debt accrued on account thereof; and for making reparations for certain losses; and for the improvement of the old harbour of Rye.
| Burlsedon Bridge, Southampton Act 1797 (repealed) | 37 Geo. 3. c. 131 | 19 July 1797 |
An act for building a bridge over Bursledon river, at or near the ferry of Bursledon, in the county of Southampton; and for making a road from the intended bridge over the river Itchen, at or near Northam, within the liberties of the town and county of the town of Southampton, to the said bridge, and from thence to Titchfield, in the said county of Southampton. (Repealed by Southampton County Council (Bursledon Bridge) Act 1930 (20 & 21 Geo. 5. c. clx))
| Saltcoates Harbour Act 1797 | 37 Geo. 3. c. 132 | 19 July 1797 |
An act for enlarging, deepening, improving, and maintaining the harbour of Saltcoats, in the county of Ayr.
| Thomas Macklin's Paintings Act 1797 (repealed) | 37 Geo. 3. c. 133 | 19 July 1797 |
An act for enabling Thomas Macklin to dispose of his collection of modern paintings, as now exhibited at his gallery in Fleet-street, by way of chance. (Repealed by Statute Law Revision Act 1948 (11 & 12 Geo. 6. c. 62))
| Duty on Horses Act 1797 (repealed) | 37 Geo. 3. c. 134 | 20 July 1797 |
An act for granting to his Majesty a further additional duty on horses kept and used for the purpose of riding, or of drawing certain carriages therein mentioned. (Repealed by House Tax Act 1803 (43 Geo. 3. c. 161))
| Legacy Duty Act 1797 (repealed) | 37 Geo. 3. c. 135 | 20 July 1797 |
An act to explain and amend an act, passed in the thirty-sixth year of his Majesty's reign, intituled, "An act for repealing certain duties on legacies, and shares of personal estate, and for granting other duties thereon, in certain cases." (Note: Legacy Duty Act 1796 (36 Geo. 3. c. 52)) (Repealed by Court of Chancery (Funds) Act 1872 (35 & 36 Vict. c. 44))
| Stamps (No. 4) Act 1797 (repealed) | 37 Geo. 3. c. 136 | 20 July 1797 |
An act to enable the commissioners of stamp duties to stamp deeds, and other instruments, bills of exchange, promissory and other notes, in the cases therein mentioned. (Repealed by Inland Revenue Repeal Act 1870 (33 & 34 Vict. c. 99))
| Banks (Scotland) (No. 3) Act 1797 (repealed) | 37 Geo. 3. c. 137 | 20 July 1797 |
An act to continue an act made in this present session of parliament, (Note: Banks (Scotland) (No. 2) Act 1797 (37 Geo. 3. c. 62)) intituled, "An act tor revive and continue for a limited time, and amend an act, passed in the present session of parliament, intituled, 'An act to allow the banks, and certain banking companies, in that part of Great Britain called Scotland, to issue notes for sums under a certain amount, for a limited time; and for indemnifying all persons who have issued notes for small sums of money in that part of the united kingdom,'" for a limited time. (Repealed by Statute Law Revision Act 1871 (34 & 35 Vict. c. 116))
| Parliamentary Elections (Scotland) Act 1797 (repealed) | 37 Geo. 3. c. 138 | 20 July 1797 |
An act to amend an act, made in the twenty-second year of the reign of his present Majesty, intituled, "An act for better securing the freedom of elections of members to serve in parliament, by disabling certain officers, employed in the collection or management of his Majesty's revenues, from giving their votes at such elections," (Note: Parliament Act 1782 (22 Geo. 3. c. 41)) by extending the provision thereof to persons voting in any meeting of freeholders for preses or clerk, or on any question relative to the adjustment of the roll of freeholders, in that part of Great Britain called Scotland; and for empowering freeholders to administer the oath of trust and possession to persons offering to vote for preses and clerks. (Repealed by Statute Law Revision Act 1871 (34 & 35 Vict. c. 116))
| Provisional Cavalry Act 1797 (repealed) | 37 Geo. 3. c. 139 | 20 July 1797 |
An act for allowing a further time for carrying into execution certain powers contained in two acts of the present session of parliament, (Note: Provisional Cavalry Act 1796 (37 Geo. 3. c. 6)) (Note: Provisional Cavalry (No. 2) Act 1796 (37 Geo. 3. c. 23)) for raising a provisional cavalry, so far as the same relate to the registering and accepting of volunteers in lieu of the said provisional cavalry, in such counties, and subdivisions of counties, wherein the said acts have not been carried into execution. (Repealed by Statute Law Revision Act 1871 (34 & 35 Vict. c. 116))
| Naval Courts-martial Act 1797 (repealed) | 37 Geo. 3. c. 140 | 20 July 1797 |
An act to enable his Majesty more easily and effectually to grant conditional pardons to persons under sentence by naval courts martial, and to regulate imprisonment under such sentences. (Repealed by Statute Law Revision Act 1871 (34 & 35 Vict. c. 116))
| Postage Act 1797 (repealed) | 37 Geo. 3. c. 141 | 20 July 1797 |
An act to enable the deputy of the clerk of the house of commons, for the time being, to send and receive letters and packets free from the duty of postage. (Repealed by Statute Law Revision Act 1861 (24 & 25 Vict. c. 101))
| East India Act 1797 (repealed) | 37 Geo. 3. c. 142 | 20 July 1797 |
An act for the better administration of justice at Calcutta, Madras, and Bombay; and for preventing British subjects from being concerned in loans to the native princes in India. (Repealed by Government of India Act 1915 (5 & 6 Geo. 5. c. 61) and Government of India Act 1935 (25 & 26 Geo. 5. c. 42))
| Weights and Measures Act 1797 (repealed) | 37 Geo. 3. c. 143 | 20 July 1797 |
An Act to explain and amend an Act made in the thirty-fifth Year of the Reign of his present Majesty, intituled, "An Act for the more effectual Prevention of the use of defective Weights, and of false and unequal Balances." (Note: Weights and Measures Act 1795 (35 Geo. 3. c. 102)) (Repealed by Weights and Measures Act 1878 (41 & 42 Vict. c. 49))
| Appropriation Act 1797 (repealed) | 37 Geo. 3. c. 144 | 20 July 1797 |
An act for granting to his Majesty a certain sum of money out of the consolidated fund, and for applying certain monies therein mentioned, for the service of the year one thousand seven hundred and ninety-seven; for further appropriating the supplies granted in this session of parliament; and for making forth duplicates of exchequer bills, lottery tickets, certificates, receipts, annuity orders, or other orders, lost, burnt, or otherwise destroyed. (Repealed by Statute Law Revision Act 1871 (34 & 35 Vict. c. 116))
| Rochdale and Bury Road Act 1797 (repealed) | 37 Geo. 3. c. 145 | 23 December 1796 |
An Act for amending, widening, altering, improving, and keeping in repair, the road from Rochdale through Bamford and Birtle to Bury, and for making and maintaining three several branches of road therefrom, all in the county palatine of Lancaster. (Repealed by Rochdale, Bamford, Birtle and Bury Road Act 1827 (7 & 8 Geo. 4. c. lxiii))
| Rochdale and Bury and Sudden Roads Act 1797 (repealed) | 37 Geo. 3. c. 146 | 23 December 1796 |
An act for amending, widening, turning, altering, improving, and keeping in repair, the road from or near the guide post, at or near a certain place, called Sudden Bridge, in the township of Castleton, within the parish of Rochdale, in the county palatine of Lancaster, to the northeasterly end of a certain street or place, in the town of Bury, within the parish of Bury, in the said county, called Clerk Street; and for making a new road from and out of the said road, at or near a place called Captain Fold, in the township of Castleton aforesaid, to communicate as well with the turnpike road leading from the town of Rochdale to the town of Manchester, in the said county, as also with the Rochdale canal, at or near a place called The Blue Pitts, in the said township of Castleton. (Repealed by Rochdale and Bury Road Act 1813 (53 Geo. 3. c. i) and Rochdale and Bury Road Act 1833 (3 & 4 Will. 4. c. viii))
| Norwich and North Walsham Road Act 1797 (repealed) | 37 Geo. 3. c. 147 | 28 December 1796 |
An Act for amending, widening, and keeping in repair, the road from Magdalen Gate, in the city of Norwich, to the King's Arms Inn, in North Walsham, in the county of Norfolk. (Repealed by Norwich and North Walsham Road Act 1813 (53 Geo. 3. c. ix) and Norwich and North Walsham Road Act 1831 (1 Will. 4. c. xxxii))
| Farnhurst Chichester and Delkey Road Act 1797 (repealed) | 37 Geo. 3. c. 148 | 3 March 1797 |
An Act for continuing the term and altering and enlarging the powers of two acts of parliament, passed in the twenty-second year of the reign of King George the Second, (Note: Surrey and Sussex Roads Act 1748 (22 Geo. 2. c. 35)) and in the tenth year of the reign of his present Majesty, (Note: Surrey and Sussex Roads (No. 2) Act 1770 (10 Geo. 3. c. 82)) for repairing and widening several roads in the county of Sussex, so far as the said acts relate to the road leading from the bridge, at the north end of Farnhurst Lane, through Midhurst, to the city of Chichester, and from Chichester aforesaid to Delkey, all in the said county of Sussex. (Repealed by Road from Farnhurst to Chichester and to Delkey Act 1818 (58 Geo. 3. c. xxxix) and Annual Turnpike Acts Continuance Act 1867 (30 & 31 Vict. c. 121))
| York and Boroughbridge Road Act 1797 (repealed) | 37 Geo. 3. c. 149 | 24 March 1797 |
An Act to enlarge the terms and powers of two several acts of parliament, the one made in the twenty-third year of the reign of his late Majesty, (Note: York and Boroughbridge Road Act 1749 (23 Geo. 2. c. 38)) and the other in the eleventh year of his present Majesty, (Note: York and Boroughbridge Road Act 1771 (11 Geo. 3. c. 66)) for repairing the road from the city of York, over Skipbridge to Borroughbridge, in the county of York. (Repealed by York and Boroughbridge Road Act 1818 (58 Geo. 3. c. ii) and Annual Turnpike Acts Continuance Act 1870 (33 & 34 Vict. c. 73))
| Stockbridge Roads Act 1797 (repealed) | 37 Geo. 3. c. 150 | 24 March 1797 |
An Act for continuing the term, and altering and enlarging the powers of two acts, passed in the twenty-ninth year of the reign of his late majesty, King George the Second, (Note: Stockbridge Roads Act 1756 (29 Geo. 2. c. 46)) and in the sixteenth year of the reign of his present Majesty, (Note: Stockbridge Road Act 1776 (16 Geo. 3. c. 67)) so far as the same relate to the roads from Basingstoke, through Popham Lane, Sutton Scotney, and Stockbridge, in the county of Southampton, to a place called Lobcomb Corner, in the county of Wilts. (Repealed by Basingstoke, Stockbridge and Lobcomb Corner Turnpike Roads Act 1855 (18 & 19 Vict. c. civ))
| Wem and Bron-y-Garth Road Act 1797 (repealed) | 37 Geo. 3. c. 151 | 24 March 1797 |
An Act for reviving, continuing, and amending, an act, passed in the eleventh year of the reign of his present Majesty, (Note: Salop and Denbigh Roads Act 1771 (11 Geo. 3. c. 95)) for repairing and widening the road leading from Wem, in the county of Salop, to the lime rocks at Bron y garth, and several other roads in the counties of Salop and Denbigh. (Repealed by Wem and Bronygarth Roads Act 1856 (19 & 20 Vict. c. ciii))
| Stratford and Long Compton Hill Roads Act 1797 (repealed) | 37 Geo. 3. c. 152 | 24 March 1797 |
An Act for enlarging the term and powers of certain acts, passed in the third, (Note: Warwick Roads Act 1729 (3 Geo. 2. c. 9)) seventeenth, (Note: Warwick Roads Act 1743 (17 Geo. 2. c. 12)) and thirtieth (Note: Somerset and Wiltshire Roads Act 1757 (30 Geo. 2. c. 40)) years of the reign of his late Majesty, and the thirteenth year of his present Majesty, (Note: Warwick and Gloucester Roads Act 1773 (13 Geo. 3. c. 97)) for repairing several roads in the counties of Warwick, Worcester, and Gloucester, so far as relate to the road leading from a gate called Shipston Toll Gate, at Bridge Town, in the parish of Old Stratford, through Alderminster, and Shipston upon Stower, to the top of Long Compton Hill, in the said county of Warwick. (Repealed by Old Stratford (Warwickshire) and Long Compton Hill Road Act 1818 (58 Geo. 3. c. xxxiv))
| Kirkcudbright Roads Act 1797 (repealed) | 37 Geo. 3. c. 153 | 27 March 1797 |
An Act for more effectually making and repairing certain roads in the stewartry of Kirkcudbright, and for amending an act made in the twentieth year of the reign of his present Majesty, (Note: Kirkcudbright Roads Act 1780 (20 Geo. 3. c. 24)) for repairing the highways, bridges, and ferries, within the said stewartry. (Repealed by Kirkcudbright Roads, Statute Labour, Bridges and Ferries Act 1818 (58 Geo. 3. c. lxxi))
| Devizes Roads Act 1797 (repealed) | 37 Geo. 3. c. 154 | 24 April 1797 |
An Act for completing, widening, and keeping in repair the road from West Lavington, unto and through the town of the Devizes, to the house known by the name of The Green Man, in Seend, in the county of Wilts; and from Rowde Ford, through the Devizes market-place, to join the Beckhampton turnpike road near Wansdyke; and from the east end of the Devizes aforesaid, to the top of Red Hone Hill, in the said county of Wilts. (Repealed by Roads to and from Devizes Act 1820 (1 Geo. 4. c. lxix))
| Chatham Roads Act 1797 (repealed) | 37 Geo. 3. c. 155 | 24 April 1797 |
An Act for continuing the term, and altering and enlarging the powers of three acts, passed in the third (Note: Kent Roads Act 1729 (3 Geo. 2. c. 15)) and seventeenth (Note: Kent Roads Act 1743 (17 Geo. 2. c. 4)) years of his late majesty King George the Second, and in the sixteenth year of the reign of his present Majesty, (Note: Kent Roads Act 1776 (16 Geo. 3. c. 69)) for repairing the road from that part of Chatham which lies next to the city of Rochester, to Saint Dunstan's Cross near the city of Canterbury, in the county of Kent, and for amending and widening the road from the turnpike road at or near a place called Makenade Corner, in the parish of Preston, to Bagham Cross and Shalmsford Lane End, in the parish of Chilham, in the said county. (Repealed by Chatham and Canterbury Road Act 1812 (52 Geo. 3. c. lxxxi))
| Dover Deal and Sandwich Road Act 1797 (repealed) | 37 Geo. 3. c. 156 | 24 April 1797 |
An Act for repairing and widening the road, leading from the town and port of Dover, through the town and borough of Deal, to a certain place in the parish of Sholden, called Foulmead Field; and for making a new road through part of the said field, and Hacklinge Brooks, and part of a certain other field, called Word Field, to or near to a messuage or farm house, called Upton Farm, in the parish of Worth otherwise Word; and for repairing and widening the road from thence to the town and port of Sandwich. (Repealed by Dover, Deal and Sandwich Road Act 1839 (2 & 3 Vict. c. xxxiii))
| Hulmes Chapel and Chelford Road Act 1797 (repealed) | 37 Geo. 3. c. 157 | 24 April 1797 |
An Act for amending, altering, widening, improving, and keeping in repair, the road from the present turnpike road at Hulmes Chapel in the county palatine of Chester, leading from Hulmes Chapel to Knutsford, to the south bridge in Chelford, in the said county, near to Chelford Chapel. (Repealed by Hulmes Chapel and Chelford Road Act 1820 (1 Geo. 4. c. xvii) and Annual Turnpike Acts Continuance Act 1872 (35 & 36 Vict. c. 85))
| Liverpool Prescot and Warrington Roads Act 1797 (repealed) | 37 Geo. 3. c. 158 | 24 April 1797 |
An Act to continue the term and alter and enlarge the powers of an act of the eleventh year of his present Majesty's reign, (Note: Lancaster Roads Act 1771 (11 Geo. 3. c. 91)) for more effectually repairing and amending the roads from Liverpool to Prescot, Ashton, and Warrington, and other roads therein mentioned, in the county palatine of Lancaster. (Repealed by Roads from Liverpool Act 1821 (1 & 2 Geo. 4. c. xv))
| Wakefield and Sheffield Road Act 1797 (repealed) | 37 Geo. 3. c. 159 | 3 May 1797 |
An Act for enlarging the term and powers of three several acts, passed in the thirty-first (Note: Leeds and Wakefield Road Act 1757 (31 Geo. 2. c. 63)) year of the reign of his late Majesty, and in the first (Note: Leeds to Sheffield Road Act 1760 (1 Geo. 3. c. 33)) and eighteenth (Note: Wakefield to Sheffield Road Act 1778 (18 Geo. 3. c. 105)) years of the reign of his present Majesty, for repairing the road from Leeds to Sheffield, in the county of York, so far as the same relate to the road from Wakefield to Sheffield. (Repealed by Wakefield and Sheffield Road Act 1813 (53 Geo. 3. c. xlviii) and Wakefield and Sheffield Road Act 1830 (11 Geo. 4 & 1 Will. 4. c. xxii))
| Halifax and Sheffield Road Act 1797 (repealed) | 37 Geo. 3. c. 160 | 3 May 1797 |
An Act for enlarging the term and powers of an act, made in the seventeenth year of the reign of his present Majesty, (Note: Halifax to Sheffield Road Act 1777 (17 Geo. 3. c. 106)) for repairing the road from Halifax to Sheffield, in the west riding of the county of York, so far as the same relate to the road from Penistone to Sheffield. (Repealed by Halifax to Sheffield Road (Third District) Act 1826 (7 Geo. 4. c. cxxvii))
| Glasgow and Renfrew Road Act 1797 (repealed) | 37 Geo. 3. c. 161 | 3 May 1797 |
An Act for enlarging the term and powers of so much of an act passed in the thirty fourth year of his present Majesty's reign as relates to the road from the toll house in Paisley Lone at the west fide of the entry to the new bridge of Glasgow by or near Park house to the east end of the bridge at Renfrew. (Repealed by Glasgow and Renfrew Road Act 1839 (2 & 3 Vict. c. l))
| Ayr (County) Roads Act 1797 (repealed) | 37 Geo. 3. c. 162 | 3 May 1797 |
An Act for enlarging the term and powers of several acts made in the twenty-sixth, (Note: Glasgow Roads Act 1753 (26 Geo. 2. c. 90)) twenty-seventh, (Note: Glasgow Roads Act 1754 (27 Geo. 2. c. 27)) and thirtieth (Note: Ayr Roads Act 175 (30 Geo. 2. c. 57)) years of his late Majesty's reign, and in the twenty-ninth (Note: Lanark and Renfrew Roads Act 1789 (29 Geo. 3. c. 92)) and thirty-second (Note: Ayr Roads Act 1792 (32 Geo. 3. c. 121)) years of his present Majesty's reign, for making and repairing the roads from Gorbals of Glasgow to Floakbridge and Easter Grange in the county of Renfrew, and other roads in the said county; and for making and repairing certain other roads in the said county branching from or connected with the roads mentioned in the said acts. (Repealed by Roads and Bridges (Scotland) Act 1878 (41 & 42 Vict. c. 51) and Local Government (Scotland) Act 1889 (52 & 53 Vict. c. 50))
| West Cowgate and Alemouth Road Act 1797 (repealed) | 37 Geo. 3. c. 163 | 3 May 1797 |
An Act for more effectually amending, improving, and keeping in repair the road from the West Cowgate, near the town of Newcastle upon Tyne, through the west end of Kenton, Ponteland, Higham Dykes, Newham Edge, Belsay Mill, and South Middleton, to the north side of the river Wanspeck, in the county of Northumberland, and also the road leading from the said road to the Alemouth turnpike road. (Repealed by Newcastle-upon-Tyne and Alemouth Road Act 1830 (11 Geo. 4 & 1 Will. 4. c. xxi))
| Perth and Crieff Roads Act 1797 (repealed) | 37 Geo. 3. c. 164 | 3 May 1797 |
An Act for amending and rendering more effectual so much of two acts, made in the twenty-ninth (Note: Perth Roads Act 1789 (29 Geo. 3. c. 17)) and thirty-third (Note: Perth Roads Act 1793 (33 Geo. 3. c. 158)) years of the reign of his present Majesty, for making and repairing certain roads in the county of Perth, as relates to the road from Perth to Crieff, and the branches thereof. (Repealed by Roads and Bridges in Perthshire Act 1811 (51 Geo. 3. c. cxcviii))
| Kirkby Lonsdale and Milnthorpe Road Act 1797 (repealed) | 37 Geo. 3. c. 165 | 3 May 1797 |
An Act for repairing, widening, and improving, the publick high road, leading from Milnthorp to Kirkby-Lonsdale, in the county of Westmorland. (Repealed by Ireby, Kirkby Lonsdale, Kirkby Kendal and Milnthorp Road Act 1819 (59 Geo. 3. c. xviii))
| Clackmannan and Perth Roads Act 1797 (repealed) | 37 Geo. 3. c. 166 | 9 May 1797 |
An Act for altering, amending, and enlarging, the term and powers of an act, made in the thirty-fourth year of his present Majesty's reign, (Note: Clackmannan and Perth Roads Act 1794 (34 Geo. 3. c. 139)) for making and repairing certain roads, in the counties of Clackmanan and Perth. (Repealed by Roads in Clackmannan and Perth Act 1813 (53 Geo. 3. c. xlvi) and Clackmannan and Perth Roads Act 1840 (3 & 4 Vict. c. xl))
| Wellingborough and Northampton Road Act 1797 (repealed) | 37 Geo. 3. c. 167 | 9 May 1797 |
An Act for amending, widening, altering, and keeping in repair, the road leading from a place called Morton's Corner, in the town of Wellingborough, in the county of Northampton, to the east end of Abington Street, in the town of Northampton. (Repealed by Wellingborough and Northampton Road Act 1819 (59 Geo. 3. c. xix) and Annual Turnpike Acts Continuance Act 1871 (34 & 35 Vict. c. 115))
| Lincoln (City) Roads Act 1797 (repealed) | 37 Geo. 3. c. 168 | 25 May 1797 |
An Act for continuing the term, and altering and enlarging the powers of two acts, passed in the twenty-ninth year of the reign of his late majesty King George the Second, (Note: Lincoln Roads Act 1756 (29 Geo. 2. c. 84)) and in the seventeenth year of the reign of his present Majesty, (Note: Lincoln Roads Act 1777 (17 Geo. 3. c. 109)) for repairing and widening certain roads leading to and from the city of Lincoln; and for repairing and widening the roads from the termination of the present turnpike road, at the foot of Bracebridge Bridge, over the said bridge, westward, to the extremity of the county of Lincoln, near a place called Potter Hill, and from the termination of the present turnpike road, at the foot of Canwick Hill, southward, to a windmill at the top of the said hill. (Repealed by Lincoln Roads Act 1841 (4 & 5 Vict. c. cviii))
| Basingstoke Roads Act 1797 (repealed) | 37 Geo. 3. c. 169 | 25 May 1797 |
An Act for continuing the term, and altering and enlarging the powers of an act passed in the twenty-eighth year of the reign of his late majesty King George the Second, (Note: Wiltshire Roads Act 1755 (28 Geo. 2. c. 44)) for repairing and widening the road from Basingstoke, through Wortin, Overton, Whitchurch, Hursborn Pryors, Andover, and Middle Wallop, in the county of Southampton, to a place called Lobcomb Corner, in the parish of Winterflow, in the county of Wilts; and of another act made in the fourteenth year of the reign of his present Majesty, (Note: Hants and Wilts Roads Act 1774 (14 Geo. 3. c. 104)) for enlarging the term and powers of the said act, for including the road from Spittle House over Weyhill to Mullen's Pond, as directed by an act, made in the twenty-ninth year of his said majesty King George the Second, and for amending the roads from Andover, through Charlton, towards Tangley, and from Charlton to Clanfield Bottom, and from Weyhill to Sarson Street; and also the road through the said town of Basingstoke; and also for amending, widening, and keeping in repair, certain other roads in the county of Southampton. (Repealed by Basingstoke and Lobcombe Corner Road Act 1821 (1 & 2 Geo. 4. c. xxv))
| Adderbury and Oxford Road Act 1797 (repealed) | 37 Geo. 3. c. 170 | 25 May 1797 |
An Act for more effectually repairing, improving, and keeping in repair, the road leading from the guide post, in the village of Adderbury, in the county of Oxford, through Kidlington, to the end of The Mileway, in the city of Oxford. (Repealed by Adderbury and Oxford Road Act 1819 (59 Geo. 3. c. cxxii), Annual Turnpike Acts Continuance Act 1875 (38 & 39 Vict. c. cxciv) and Statute Law (Repeals) Act 2013 (c. 2))
| Kinross and Alloa Road Act 1797 (repealed) | 37 Geo. 3. c. 171 | 25 May 1797 |
An Act for making and repairing the road from Kinross in the county of Kinross, to Alloa, in the county of Clackmanan. (Repealed by Kinross and Alloa Road Act 1829 (10 Geo. 4. c. xci))
| Salop Roads Act 1797 (repealed) | 37 Geo. 3. c. 172 | 6 June 1797 |
An Act for amending, widening, altering, improving, and keeping in repair, the road leading from Atcham, through Condover to Dorrington; and also the road branching out of the said road, at a place called Allfield Turning, in the said parish of Condover, to the turnpike road leading from Shrewsbury to Ludlow, at a place called Hongerhill, in the same parish, all in the county of Salop. (Repealed by Atcham and Dorrington Road Act 1819 (59 Geo. 3. c. l) and Annual Turnpike Acts Continuance Act 1852 (15 & 16 Vict. c. 58))
| Bolton Blackburn and Twisey Roads Act 1797 (repealed) | 37 Geo. 3. c. 173 | 6 June 1797 |
An Act for amending, widening, altering, and keeping in repair, the road from Bolton in the Moors, to Blackburn, in the county palatine of Lancaster. (Repealed by Road from Bolton-le-Moors to Blackburn Act 1830 (11 Geo. 4 & 1 Will. 4. c. xxx))
| Bury and Bolton Roads Act 1797 (repealed) | 37 Geo. 3. c. 174 | 19 June 1797 |
An Act for amending, widening, altering, and keeping in repair, the road from or near Edenfield Chapel, in the township of Tottington Higher End, in the parish of Bury, to the township of Little Bolton, in the parish of Bolton in le Moors; and also for making and maintaining a road, from the said road, at or near a place called Booth Pitts, in the township of Tottington Lower End, to or near Bury Bridge, in the township of Elton, in the said parish of Bury, all in the county palatine of Lancaster. (Repealed by Road from Edenfield Chapel to Little Bolton (Lancashire) Act 1830 (11 Geo. 4 & 1 Will. 4. c. xxxi))
| Frome Roads Act 1797 (repealed) | 37 Geo. 3. c. 175 | 19 June 1797 |
An Act for enlarging the term and powers of two acts, passed in the thirtieth year of the reign of his late Majesty (Note: Frome Roads Act 1757 (30 Geo. 2. c. 39)) and the twelfth year of the reign of his present Majesty, (Note: Frome Roads Act 1772 (12 Geo. 3. c. 94)) for repairing and widening several roads leading to, through, and from the town of Frome in the county of Somerset; and for paving the footways and lighting the streets within the said town. (Repealed by Roads to and through Frome Act 1831 (1 & 2 Will. 4. c. lxvi))
| Leominster Roads Act 1797 (repealed) | 37 Geo. 3. c. 176 | 19 June 1797 |
An Act for enlarging the term and powers of several acts, for amending and keeping in repair several roads therein mentioned, leading into the town of Leominster, in the county of Hereford. (Repealed by Leominster Roads Act 1800 (39 & 40 Geo. 3. c. lxv))
| Newport Pagnell Roads Act 1797 (repealed) | 37 Geo. 3. c. 177 | 22 June 1797 |
An Act for more effectually repairing the roads between the house commonly called The Horseshoe House, in the parish of Stoke Goldington, in the county of Buckingham, and the town of Northampton; and from the north bridge of Newport Pagnel, in the said county of Buckingham, to the said Horseshoe House. (Repealed by Road from Northampton to Newport Pagnell Act 1839 (2 & 3 Vict. c. xiii))
| Bristol Roads Act 1797 (repealed) | 37 Geo. 3. c. 178 | 4 July 1797 |
An Act for extending the term and amending and enlarging the powers of an act, passed in the nineteenth year of the reign of his present Majesty, intituled, "An act for making and repairing several roads round the city of Bristol;" (Note: Bristol Roads Act 1779 (19 Geo. 3. c. 117)) and for making and keeping in repair a road from the turnpike gate, at the sign of The Blackbirds, on the Stapleton and Mangotsfield common road, into the Bitton, and Toghill common road. (Repealed by Bristol Roads Act 1819 (59 Geo. 3. c. xcv))
| Cambridge and Arrington Roads Act 1797 (repealed) | 37 Geo. 3. c. 179 | 19 July 1797 |
An Act for amending, altering, improving, and keeping in repair, the road leading from the town of Cambridge, into the old north road near Arrington Bridge, all in the county of Cambridge. (Repealed by Road from Cambridge to Arrington Bridge Act 1817 (57 Geo. 3. c. lxviii) and Annual Turnpike Acts Continuance Act 1870 (33 & 34 Vict. c. 73))
| Fife Roads Act 1797 (repealed) | 37 Geo. 3. c. 180 | 19 July 1797 |
An Act for enlarging the term and powers of an act, passed in the thirtieth year of his present Majesty's reign, intituled, "An act for making and repairing the road from Newmiln Bridge, by Foodie's mill, Inverkeithing, Aberdour, Kircaldy, Gallatown, and Cameron Bridge, to Craill, and other roads in the county of Fife;" (Note: Fife Roads Act 1790 (30 Geo. 3. c. 93)) and for making and repairing other roads in the said county. (Repealed by Fife, Kinross, Perth and Clackmannan Roads Act 1810 (50 Geo. 3. c. lxxii) and Fife Turnpike Roads Act 1829 (10 Geo. 4. c. lxxxiv))

=== Private acts ===
| Short title | Citation | Royal assent |
Long title
| High Ham Inclosure Act 1797 | 37 Geo. 3. c. 14 Pr. | 28 December 1796 |
An act for dividing, allotting, and enclosing the open commonable lands, and fields, within the parish of High-ham, in the county of Somerset, and also a certain open or commonable field called, Ham Down, lying partly within the said parish of High-ham and partly within the parish of Huish Episcopi in the same county.
| Westonzoyland Inclosure Act 1797 | 37 Geo. 3. c. 15 Pr. | 28 December 1796 |
An act for dividing, allotting, and enclosing, the open and commonable pastures, within the parish of Weston Zoyland, in the county of Somerset.
| Street Inclosure Act 1797 | 37 Geo. 3. c. 16 Pr. | 28 December 1796 |
An act for dividing, allotting, and enclosing, a certain parcel or tract of commonable ground, formerly part of King's Sedgmoor, lying in the parish of Street, in the county of Somerset; and also for dividing and allotting a certain parcel or tract of waste land, called Turf Moor, in the parish of Street aforesaid.
| Muntz's Naturalization Act 1797 | 37 Geo. 3. c. 17 Pr. | 28 December 1796 |
An act for naturalizing Phillipp Frederick Muntz.
| Bright's Divorce Act 1797 | 37 Geo. 3. c. 18 Pr. | 30 December 1796 |
An act to dissolve the marriage of William Bright, with Hannah Lockwood his now wife, and to enable him to marry again, and for other purposes therein mentioned.
| Charterhouse Hospital Act 1797 | 37 Geo. 3. c. 19 Pr. | 3 March 1797 |
An act to enable the governors of the hospital of King James, founded in Charter House, to sell and convey a messuage, cottages, and divers lands, tenements, and hereditaments, in Fulstow Marsh, Chappel, and Tetney, in the county of Lincoln; and for laying out the money arising from such sale in the purchase of other lands and tenements, or hereditaments, for the benefit of the said hospital.
| Lichfield Cathedral Act 1797 | 37 Geo. 3. c. 20 Pr. | 3 March 1797 |
An act to explain and amend an act, passed in the fourth and fifth years of the reign of her late majesty, Queen Anne, intituled, "An act for augmenting the number of canons residentiary in the cathedral church of Litchfield, and for improving the deanry and prebends of the said cathedral," (Note: Lichfield Chapter Act 1706 (4 & 5 Ann. c. 33 Pr.)) and to make further provision for the canons residentiary in the said cathedral church, and an addition to the fabrick fund thereof.
| Exton and Cutcombe Inclosure Act 1797 | 37 Geo. 3. c. 21 Pr. | 3 March 1797 |
An act for dividing allotting, and enclosing, the several commons and waste lands, within the parish of Exton, in the county of Somerset, and also within the several manors of Cutcombe Mohun, and Cutcombe Rawleigh, in the parish of Cutcombe, in the same county.
| Marquis of Lansdowne's Relief Act 1797 | 37 Geo. 3. c. 22 Pr. | 7 March 1797 |
An act to relieve William marquis of Lansdown from certain disabilities in consequence of his having sat and voted in the house of peers without being duly qualified, by taking the oaths and making the declaration prescribed by law, and subscribing the same respectively.
| Dunton Inclosure Act 1797 | 37 Geo. 3. c. 23 Pr. | 7 March 1797 |
An act for dividing and enclosing the open and common fields, meadows, pastures, and other commonable lands and grounds, in the parish of Dunton in the county of Bedford.
| Bagelmann, Siffken and Tatter's Naturalization Act 1797 | 37 Geo. 3. c. 24 Pr. | 7 March 1797 |
An act for naturalizing Jacob Bagelmann, John Siffken, and George Lewis Christian Tatter.
| Swayfield Inclosure Act 1797 | 37 Geo. 3. c. 25 Pr. | 10 March 1797 |
An act for dividing, allotting, and enclosing the open and common fields, meadows, pasture, and all other unenclosed lands and grounds in the parish of Swayfield, in the county of Lincoln, and a parcel of open land called The Intercommon, within, or belonging to, the said parish of Swayfield, and to the parish of Corby in the said county.
| Campton-cum-Shefford Inclosure Act 1797 | 37 Geo. 3. c. 26 Pr. | 10 March 1797 |
An act for dividing and enclosing the several open and common fields, meadows, pastures, waste lands and commonable grounds, in the parish of Campton cum Shefford, in the county of Bedford.
| Harewood Inclosure Act 1797 | 37 Geo. 3. c. 27 Pr. | 10 March 1797 |
An act for dividing and enclosing several open fields, and meadow and pasture ground, and several moors or commons, within the manor and parish of Harewood, in the county of York.
| Wienholt's Naturalization Act 1797 | 37 Geo. 3. c. 28 Pr. | 10 March 1797 |
An act for naturalizing Henry Wienholt.
| Libotton's Naturalization Act 1797 | 37 Geo. 3. c. 29 Pr. | 10 March 1797 |
An act for naturalizing Anthony Henry Libotton.
| Puriton Inclosure Act 1797 | 37 Geo. 3. c. 30 Pr. | 24 March 1797 |
An act for dividing, allotting, and enclosing, the commons and waste lands, within the parish of Puriton, in the county of Somerset.
| Huish Episcopi Inclosure Act 1797 | 37 Geo. 3. c. 31 Pr. | 24 March 1797 |
An act for dividing, allotting, and enclosing, the open and commonable lands and fields, within the parish of Huish Episcopi, in the county of Somerset.
| Othery Inclosure Act 1797 | 37 Geo. 3. c. 32 Pr. | 24 March 1797 |
An act for dividing and allotting the open and commonable pastures, and for exchanging, allotting, and improving, the open and commonable arable lands, within the parish of Othery, in the county of Somerset.
| Martin's Name Act 1797 | 37 Geo. 3. c. 33 Pr. | 24 March 1797 |
An act to enable Denny Martin, doctor !n divinity, to take, use, and bear, the surname and arms of Fairfax, pursuant to the will of the right honourable Thomas lord Fairfax deceased.
| Runquist's Naturalization Act 1797 | 37 Geo. 3. c. 34 Pr. | 24 March 1797 |
An act for naturalizing Peter Andrew Runquist.
| Tring Inclosure Act 1797 | 37 Geo. 3. c. 35 Pr. | 27 March 1797 |
An act for dividing, allotting, and enclosing, the open and common fields, common meadows, common pastures, and waste lands and grounds, within the parish of Tring, in the county of Hertford.
| Barningham Inclosure Act 1797 | 37 Geo. 3. c. 36 Pr. | 27 March 1797 |
An act for dividing, allotting, and enclosing, the common fields, half year or shack lands, heaths, commons, and waste grounds, within the parish of Barningham, in the county of Suffolk.
| Acle Inclosure Act 1797 | 37 Geo. 3. c. 37 Pr. | 27 March 1797 |
An act for dividing, allotting, and enclosing, the arable lands, intermixed pastures, commons, and waste grounds, within the parish of Acle, in the county of Norfolk.
| Hitcham Rector's Exchange Act 1797 | 37 Geo. 3. c. 38 Pr. | 24 April 1797 |
An act to enable the rector of the parish church of Hitcham, in the county of Bucks, to exchange part of his glebe lands there for other lands in the same parish, belonging to the right honourable William Wyndham lord Grenville.
| Arundel Castle Estate Act 1797 | 37 Geo. 3. c. 39 Pr. | 24 April 1797 |
An act to enable the trustees, to be therein named, to make exchange of certain estates comprised in the act of the third of Charles the First, (Note: Earl of Arundel's Dignity and Estate Act 1627 (3 Cha. 1. c. 4 Pr.)) for entailing the castle and manor of Arundel, in the county of Sussex, and certain other estates in the laid act mentioned.
| Arundel Manor Act 1797 | 37 Geo. 3. c. 40 Pr. | 24 April 1797 |
An act for the enfranchisement of copyhold and customary lands, parcel of the manor of Arundel, and other manors entailed by the act of parliament of the third of Charles the First, and for the sale of tythes, also entailed by the said act.
| Sawley and Winksley Inclosure Act 1797 | 37 Geo. 3. c. 41 Pr. | 24 April 1797 |
An act for dividing, allotting, and enclosing, certain moors, commons, or waste grounds, within the townships of Sawley and Winksley, in the parish of Ripon, in the county of York.
| Wing Inclosure Act 1797 | 37 Geo. 3. c. 42 Pr. | 24 April 1797 |
An act for dividing, allotting, and enclosing the open and common arable fields, common meadows, common and waste lands, within the parish of Wing, in the county of Buckingham.
| Halton Inclosure Act 1797 | 37 Geo. 3. c. 43 Pr. | 24 April 1797 |
An act for dividing, allotting, and enclosing, a certain tract or parcel of moor, common, or waste ground, called Halton Moor, within and parcel of the manor of Halton, in the parish of Halton, in the county palatine of Lancaster.
| Hornby Inclosure Act 1797 | 37 Geo. 3. c. 44 Pr. | 24 April 1797 |
An act for dividing and enclosing certain tracts or parcels of moor, common or waste grounds, within and parcel of the honor and manor of Hornby, in the county palatine of Lancaster.
| Etwall Inclosure Act 1797 | 37 Geo. 3. c. 45 Pr. | 24 April 1797 |
An act for dividing and enclosing the several open common fields, meadows, and pastures, commons and waste grounds, within the parish of Etwall, in the county of Derby.
| Chewton Mendip Inclosure Act 1797 | 37 Geo. 3. c. 46 Pr. | 24 April 1797 |
An act for dividing, allotting, and enclosing, the open commons and waste lands within, or adjoining to, the township or parish of Chewton Mendip, in the county of Somerset.
| Over Kellet Inclosure Act 1797 | 37 Geo. 3. c. 47 Pr. | 24 April 1797 |
An act for dividing and enclosing a certain tract or parcel of moor, common, or waste ground, called Over Kellett Moor, within and parcel of the manor or lordship of Over Kellett, in the parish of Bolton by the Sands, in the county palatine of Lancaster.
| Dalton Inclosure Act 1797 | 37 Geo. 3. c. 48 Pr. | 24 April 1797 |
An act for dividing and enclosing the common fields, and waste lands, within the township of Dalton, in the several parishes of Rotherham and Thrybergh, in the west riding of the county of York.
| Thornborough Inclosure Act 1797 | 37 Geo. 3. c. 49 Pr. | 24 April 1797 |
An act for dividing and enclosing the open and common fields, common meadows, common pastures, and other commonable lands and grounds, within the parish of Thornborough, in the county of Buckingham.
| Allcannings and Allington Inclosure Act 1797 | 37 Geo. 3. c. 50 Pr. | 24 April 1797 |
An act for dividing, allotting, and laying in severalty, the open and common fields and downs, common meadows, common pastures, and other open lands and grounds, within the several hamlets or tythings of Allcannings and Allington, in the county of Wilts.
| Saham Toney Inclosure Act 1797 | 37 Geo. 3. c. 51 Pr. | 24 April 1797 |
An act for dividing, allotting, and enclosing, the whole year lands, common fields, half year or shack lands, fens, commons, commonable wood grounds, and other commonable and waste lands, within the parish of Saham Tone, in the county of Norfolk.
| Wingrave-with-Rowsham Inclosure Act 1797 | 37 Geo. 3. c. 52 Pr. | 24 April 1797 |
An act for dividing and enclosing the open and common fields, common meadows, and other commonable lands, within the parish of Wingrave with Rowsham, in the county of Buckingham.
| Bedford Inclosure Act 1797 (repealed) | 37 Geo. 3. c. 53 Pr. | 24 April 1797 |
An act for dividing, allotting, and enclosing, the open and common fields, pastures, commons, and waste grounds, within the parish of Saint Mary, in the town of Bedford, in the county of Bedford. (Repealed by Statute Law (Repeals) Act 1995 (c. 44))
| Uggeshall, &c. Inclosure Act 1797 | 37 Geo. 3. c. 54 Pr. | 24 April 1797 |
An act for dividing and enclosing the heaths, fen grounds, commons, and waste lands, within the parishes of Uggeshall, Frostenden, and South Cove, in the county of Suffolk.
| Sotterly, Henstead, &c. Inclosure Act 1797 | 37 Geo. 3. c. 55 Pr. | 24 April 1797 |
An act for dividing and enclosing the heaths, fen grounds, commons, and waste lands, within the parishes of Sotterly, Henstead with Hulverstreet, and Wrentham, in the county of Suffolk.
| Harwood Inclosure Act 1797 | 37 Geo. 3. c. 56 Pr. | 24 April 1797 |
An act for dividing, allotting, and enclosing the commons and waste grounds, within the township of Harwood, in the county palatine of Lancaster.
| Barrow Inclosure Act 1797 | 37 Geo. 3. c. 57 Pr. | 24 April 1797 |
An act for dividing, allotting, and enclosing, the open fields, meadows, common pastures, and other common and waste lands and grounds, in the parish of Barrow, in the county of Lincoln.
| Lord Cadogan's Divorce Act 1797 | 37 Geo. 3. c. 58 Pr. | 24 April 1797 |
An act to dissolve the marriage of the right honourable Charles Sloane Cadogan, lord Cadogan, with Mary Churchill, his now wife, and to enable him to marry again, and for other purposes therein mentioned.
| Woodhouse's Estate Act 1797 | 37 Geo. 3. c. 59 Pr. | 3 May 1797 |
An act for effectuating a settlement of the freehold and copyhold estates of Charlotte Laura, the wife of John Wodehouse esquire, late Charlotte Laura Norris spinster, pursuant to articles executed previous to their marriage, notwithstanding the infancy of the said Charlotte Laura Wodehouse.
| Browne's Estate Act 1797 | 37 Geo. 3. c. 60 Pr. | 3 May 1797 |
An act to enable the trustees and executors of the will of Samuel Browne merchant, to settle the residue of his personal estate, and the produce of his real estate, pursuant to the agreements made previous to the marriages of his daughters, Pleasance the wife of Edward Roger Pratt the elder, esquire, and Hester the wife of Jacob Henry Astley esquire.
| Hassell's Estate Act 1797 | 37 Geo. 3. c. 61 Pr. | 3 May 1797 |
An act for vesting in trustees the settled estates of George Hassell esquire, in trust to sell the same, and to lay out the money arising from the sale thereof in the purchase of other estates, to be settled to the uses therein mentioned.
| Chaplin's, &c. Partition Act 1797 | 37 Geo. 3. c. 62 Pr. | 3 May 1797 |
An act for effectuating a partition of certain estates of Francis Chaplin esquire, and Theophilus Buckworth esquire, in the county of Lincoln.
| Sapperton Inclosure Act 1797 | 37 Geo. 3. c. 63 Pr. | 3 May 1797 |
An act for dividing, allotting, and enclosing, the commons, moors, wastes, and waste grounds, called Lea Moor, or Sapperton Moor, and Hare Hill, and also a certain common meadow, and all other commonable places and waste grounds, within the township or liberty of Sapperton, in the parish of Church Broughton, in the county of Derby.
| Chalgrave Inclosure Act 1797 | 37 Geo. 3. c. 64 Pr. | 3 May 1797 |
An act for dividing and enclosing the open and common fields, meadows, lands, commons, and commonable places, in the parish of Chalgrave, in the county of Bedford.
| Earl Spencer's Estate Act 1797 | 37 Geo. 3. c. 65 Pr. | 9 May 1797 |
An act for vesting in trustees, and their heirs, certain estates at Mappowder and Plush, in the county of Dorset, and Inkpen and Kintbury, in the county of Bucks, devised by the will of John late earl Spencer, in trust, to convey the same to the right honourable George John earl Spencer, and his heirs, discharged from the uses and trusts of the said will, on the said right honourable George John earl Spencer, settling in lieu thereof, to the uses and upon the trusts of the said will, his estate at Chapel Brampton, in the county of Northampton,
| Earl of Ashburnham's &c. Exchange Act 1797 | 37 Geo. 3. c. 66 Pr. | 9 May 1797 |
An act for effectuating an exchange between the right honourable John earl of Ashburnham and the dean and chapter of Canterbury, of the advowson of the rectory of Ninfield for the advowson of the vicarage of Ashbournham, both in the county of Sussex.
| Mollington Inclosure Act 1797 | 37 Geo. 3. c. 67 Pr. | 9 May 1797 |
An act for dividing and enclofing the open and common fields, common pastures, common meadows, and common or waste land, in Mollington, in the counties of Oxford and Warwick, within the parish of Cropredy, in the said county of Oxford.
| Whitchurch Inclosure Act 1797 | 37 Geo. 3. c. 68 Pr. | 9 May 1797 |
An act for dividing, allotting, and enclosing, the several common fields, common downs, common pastures, waste lands, and other commonable places, within the parish of Whitchurch, in the county of Southampton, except the commonable lands lying within the borough of Whitchurch, and except the common arable field called The Burgage Field.
| Whittlebury Inclosure Act 1797 | 37 Geo. 3. c. 69 Pr. | 9 May 1797 |
An act for dividing and enclosing the open and common fields, common meadows, common pastures, and other commonable lands and grounds, within the parish and liberties of Whittlebury, in the county of Northampton, (except such commonable lands and grounds within the said parish and liberties as lie within the present ringmound of the foreft of Whittlewood, or Whittlebury); and for extinguishing a right of common in and over two certain pieces of ground within the said parish, called Porter's Wood, and Long Hedge.
| Walsall Grammar School's Estate Act 1797 | 37 Geo. 3. c. 70 Pr. | 11 May 1797 |
An act for enabling the governors of the free grammar school of Queen Mary, at Walsall in the county of Stafford, to sell certain mines under part of their lands, and to sell or exchange certain parts of their lands lying dispersed, for improving and extending the benefits of the foundation of the said school, for enlarging the trusts and powers of the said governors, and for enabling them to build a chapel, and for other purposes.
| Hornby and Tatham Manors Act 1797 | 37 Geo. 3. c. 71 Pr. | 11 May 1797 |
An act for establishing and rendering effectual certain articles of agreement, enabling the several fee farm and customary tenants within the honor, manor, and lordship of Hornby, and manor of Tatham, in the county palatine of Lancaster, who heretofore have omitted, now to come and in and purchase the timber trees and underwoods growing upon their respective tenements, and for vesting the sole property thereof in them respectively, and extinguishing the customary right of the other tenants therein, and for releasing and extinguishing the freehold fee farm and customary rents, boons, fines, and other services of right, due and accustomed for the tenements of such of the said tenants who have executed the said articles of agreement, and for extending the like powers and benefits to such of the said tenants, not being parties to the said articles, who shall, within a limited time, conform to the trusts thereof, with such exceptions and reservations only as are in this bill mentioned.
| Davis's Estate Act 1797 | 37 Geo. 3. c. 72 Pr. | 11 May 1797 |
An act for vesting certain undivided parts or shares, devised by the will of James Davis esquire, of and in several estates in the counties of Monmouth and Gloucester, in trustees to be sold, and for applying part of the money arising thereby in discharging incumbrances, and for laying out the surplus in the purchase of other estates, to be settled in lieu thereof, and to the same uses.
| Salter's Estate Act 1797 | 37 Geo. 3. c. 73 Pr. | 11 May 1797 |
An act for sale of certain lands and hereditaments in the parish of Burnham, in the county of Bucks, devised by the will of Elliot Salter esquire, deceased, and for laying out the money arising by sale thereof in the purchase of other lands, tenements, and hereditaments, to be conveyed to the same uses.
| Coln St. Dennis Inclosure Act 1797 | 37 Geo. 3. c. 74 Pr. | 11 May 1797 |
An act for dividing, allotting, and enclosing, the open and common fields, common meadows, common pastures, and other commonable and waste lands, in the parish of Coln Saint Dennis, in the county of Gloucester.
| Diddington Inclosure Act 1797 | 37 Geo. 3. c. 75 Pr. | 11 May 1797 |
An act for dividing, allotting, and enclosing, the common and open fields, ings, common meadows, common pastures, commons, and other open commonable lands, and waste grounds, in the parish of Diddington, otherwise Dodington, in the county of Huntingdon.
| Ashcott Inclosure Act 1797 | 37 Geo. 3. c. 76 Pr. | 11 May 1797 |
An act for dividing, allotting, and enclosing, all the commons and waste lands, within the parish of Ashcott, in the county of Somerset.
| Perrott's Estate Act 1797 | 37 Geo. 3. c. 77 Pr. | 25 May 1797 |
An act for vesting certain lands and hereditaments, devifed by the will of John Perrott esquire, deceased, in trustees, to sell and exchange; and for applying the sum of one thousand pounds, arising from such sale or exchange, in discharge of a mortgage affecting the said devised estates; and for laying out the residue of the said money in the purchase of other hereditaments, to be settled to the same uses, and to enable the said trustees, and the several other persons therein named, to grant building and other leases of the said devised estates.
| Stinton's Lease Act 1797 | 37 Geo. 3. c. 78 Pr. | 25 May 1797 |
An act for enabling Thomas Stinton, doctor in divinity, and his successors, to grant, in manner therein mentioned, a lease of a certain part of the prebendal lands situate in the several parishes therein mentioned.
| Taylor's Estate Act 1797 | 37 Geo. 3. c. 79 Pr. | 25 May 1797 |
An act for vesting part of the settled estates of Charles William Taylor esquire, in trustees, to be sold, for paying incumbrances, and for laying out the surplus monies in the purchase of other estates, to be settled in lieu thereof, and to the same uses, and for other purposes.
| Lowther's Estate Act 1797 | 37 Geo. 3. c. 80 Pr. | 25 May 1797 |
An act for vesting certain detached parts of the settled estates of sir William Lowther, baronet, in trustees, in trust, to convey the same to the said sir William Lowther in fee, upon his the said fir William Lowther's conveying other estates to the uses of the settled estates.
| Beach's Estate Act 1797 | 37 Geo. 3. c. 81 Pr. | 25 May 1797 |
An act for vesting the manor of East Mark, and certain lands and hereditaments in the county of Somerset, part of the settled estates of Henrietta Maria, the wife of Michael Hicks Beach esquire, in trustees, to be sold, and for investing the money arising by such sale in the purchase of other lands and hereditaments, to be settled to the same uses.
| Sacheverell's, &c. Partition Act 1797 | 37 Geo. 3. c. 82 Pr. | 25 May 1797 |
An act to confirm and render valid and effectual a partition of divers messuages, cottages, lands, tenements, and hereditaments, in the several counties of Warwick and Stafford, whereof an undivided moiety was devised by the will of Anna Maria Sacheverell widow, and the other undivided moiety by the will of Jane Gough widow, deceased, and for settling and assuring the specific messuages, lands, and hereditaments, which upon such partition have been allotted to be held in severalty, for or in lieu of each of the said undivided moieties, to such uses as by the said wills are limited, of and concerning the said undivided moieties respectively.
| Trinity House Estate Act 1797 | 37 Geo. 3. c. 83 Pr. | 25 May 1797 |
An act for vesting several messuages and hereditaments in the parish of Allhallows Steyning, in the city of London, in the corporation of the Trinity House, subject to several perpetual yearly rent charges payable to the rector, clerk, sexton, and churchwardens, of the same parish.
| Chaddesley Corbett Inclosure Act 1797 | 37 Geo. 3. c. 84 Pr. | 25 May 1797 |
An act for dividing, allotting, and enclosing, the commons, commonable woods, and waste lands, within the manor and parish of Chaddesley Corbett, in the county of Worcester.
| Easterton Inclosure Act 1797 | 37 Geo. 3. c. 85 Pr. | 25 May 1797 |
An act for dividing, allotting, and laying in severalty, the open and common fields, and downs, common pastures, and other open lands and grounds, within the hamlet or tything of Easterton, in the county of Wilts.
| Bunny Inclosure Act 1797 | 37 Geo. 3. c. 86 Pr. | 25 May 1797 |
An act for dividing and enclosing the common or waste grounds, open fields, meadows, and pastures, within the manor and parish of Bunny, in the county of Nottingham.
| Wyke Regis Inclosure Act 1797 | 37 Geo. 3. c. 87 Pr. | 25 May 1797 |
An act for dividing, allotting, and enclosing, the open and common fields, and other commonable lands and grounds, within the parish of Wyke Regis, in the county of Dorset.
| Great Wilbraham Inclosure Act 1797 | 37 Geo. 3. c. 88 Pr. | 25 May 1797 |
An act for dividing, allotting, and laying in severalty, the common and open fields, common meadows, commonable lands, commons, and waste grounds, within the parish of Great Wilbraham, in the county of Cambridge.
| Little Wilbraham Inclosure Act 1797 | 37 Geo. 3. c. 89 Pr. | 25 May 1797 |
An act for dividing, allotting, enclosing, and laying in severalty, the common and open fields, common meadows, commonable lands, commons, and waste grounds, within the parish of Little Wilbraham, in the county of Cambridge.
| Corse Inclosure (Amendment) Act 1797 | 37 Geo. 3. c. 90 Pr. | 25 May 1797 |
An act to explain, amend, and enlarge, the powers of an act passed in the thirty-fourth year of the reign of his majesty King George the Third, intituled, "An act for dividing and enclosing the open and common fields, common meadows, common pastures, and other commonable lands, within the parish of Corse, in the county of Gloucester." (Note: Corse Inclosure Act 1794 (34 Geo. 3. c. 113 Pr.))
| Toddington Inclosure Act 1797 | 37 Geo. 3. c. 91 Pr. | 25 May 1797 |
An act for dividing, and enclosing, the open and common fields, meadows, commons, and waste grounds, in the lordship of Toddington, and hamlet of Charlton, in the parish of Toddington, in the county of Bedford.
| Barnby and Mutford Inclosure Act 1797 | 37 Geo. 3. c. 92 Pr. | 25 May 1797 |
An act for dividing and enclosing the heaths, fen grounds, commons, and waste lands, within the parishes of Barnby and Mutford, in the county of Suffolk.
| Elstow Inclosure Act 1797 | 37 Geo. 3. c. 93 Pr. | 25 May 1797 |
An act for dividing and enclosing the common and open fields, common meadows, and other commonable lands and waste grounds, in the parish of Elstow, in the county of Bedford.
| Ditton Inclosure Act 1797 | 37 Geo. 3. c. 94 Pr. | 25 May 1797 |
An act for allotting, dividing, and enclosing the several commons and waste lands in the township of Ditton, in the parish of Prescot, in the county palatine of Lancaster.
| Shipham and Winscombe Inclosure Act 1797 | 37 Geo. 3. c. 95 Pr. | 25 May 1797 |
An act for dividing, allotting, and enclosing, the several commons and waste lands, lying and being within the parishes of Shipham and Winscombe, in the county of Somerset.
| Cooke's Divorce Act 1797 | 37 Geo. 3. c. 96 Pr. | 25 May 1797 |
An act to dissolve the marriage of Joseph Henry Cooke surgeon, with Elizabeth Smith his now wife, and to enable him to marry again, and for other purposes therein mentioned.
| M'Gauley's Divorce Act 1797 | 37 Geo. 3. c. 97 Pr. | 25 May 1797 |
An act to dissolve the marriage of James M'Gauley with Elizabeth Rowlands his now wife. and to enable him to marry again. and for other purposes therein mentioned.
| Haussoullier's Naturalization Act 1797 | 37 Geo. 3. c. 98 Pr. | 25 May 1797 |
An act for naturalizing Lewis John Marie Haussoullier.
| Drake's Estate Act 1797 | 37 Geo. 3. c. 99 Pr. | 6 June 1797 |
An act for allowing timber to be cut upon certain estates settled by the will and codicil of sir Francis Henry Drake, baronet, and for applying and laying out the money to arise therefrom in the purchase of other estates, to be settled to the same uses.
| Earl Cholmondeley's Estate Act 1797 | 37 Geo. 3. c. 100 Pr. | 6 June 1797 |
An act for vesting several estates in the county of Chester, of the right honourable George James earl Cholmondeley, as devisee for life under the will of the honourable general James Cholmondeley, deceased, in the said earl Cholmondeley, in fee simple, and for settling other estates of the said earl, in the same county, in lieu thereof.
| Dashwood's Estate Act 1797 | 37 Geo. 3. c. 101 Pr. | 6 June 1797 |
An act for vesting part of the estates of the late sir James Dashwood in trustees, in trust, to sell the same, and to apply the money arising thereby in discharging certain incumbrances therein mentioned, and to apply the residue, if any, of the money arising from such sale or sales in the purchase of estates, to be settled to the uses of the will of the said sir James Dashwood.
| Southoe Inclosure Act 1797 | 37 Geo. 3. c. 102 Pr. | 6 June 1797 |
An act for dividing, allotting, and enclosing, the common and open fields, ings, common meadows, common pastures, commons, and other open commonable lands and waste grounds, in the parish of Southoe, in the county of Huntingdon.
| Holwell, &c. Inclosure Act 1797 | 37 Geo. 3. c. 103 Pr. | 6 June 1797 |
An act for dividing, allotting, and enclosing, the several open, common, and waste lands, within the several manors of Holwell and Woodbridge, and in the parish of Helwell, in the county of Somerset.
| Somerton, &c. Inclosure Act 1797 | 37 Geo. 3. c. 104 Pr. | 6 June 1797 |
An act for dividing, allotting, and enclosing the open and common fields, common pastures, and other commonable and waste lands, within the several parishes of Somerton, and Compton Dundon, and certain open or commonable lands, called Southmead and Kingsmoor, situate within the several parishes of Somerton, Long Sutton, Kingsdon, Northover, and Ilchester, and the hamlets or tithings of Widcombe, Ash, and Milton, in the parish of Martock, some or one of them, and also so much of a certain allotment or tract of unenclosed land, within the said parish of Long Sutton, as appertaineth to sundry tenements within the manor of Knoll, in the parish of Long Sutton aforesaid, all in the county of Somerset.
| North Curry, &c. Inclosure Act 1797 | 37 Geo. 3. c. 105 Pr. | 6 June 1797 |
An act for dividing, allotting, and enclosing, certain moors, commons, or waste lands and grounds, lying and being within the parishes of North Curry, Stoke Saint Gregory, and West Hatch, in the county of Somerset.
| Cridling Stubbs Inclosure Act 1797 | 37 Geo. 3. c. 106 Pr. | 6 June 1797 |
An act for dividing, allotting, and enclosing, certain pieces of common or waste land, within the township of Cridling Stubbs, in the west riding of the county of York.
| Lindridge Inclosure Act 1797 | 37 Geo. 3. c. 107 Pr. | 6 June 1797 |
An act for dividing, allotting, and enclosing, certain commons or waste lands within the manor and parish of Lindridge, in the county of Worcester.
| Ashelworth Inclosure Act 1797 | 37 Geo. 3. c. 108 Pr. | 6 June 1797 |
An act for dividing, allotting, and enclosing, the open and common fields and meadows, commonable and intermixed lands and waste grounds, within, or belonging to, the parish of Ashelworth, in the county of Gloucester.
| Moreton Corbet, &c. Inclosure Act 1797 | 37 Geo. 3. c. 109 Pr. | 6 June 1797 |
An act for dividing, allotting, and enclosing, certain commons or waste lands, in the several parishes of Moreton Corbet, Shawbury, Stanton upon Hine Heath, and Hodnet, in the county of Salop.
| Southill Inclosure Act 1797 | 37 Geo. 3. c. 110 Pr. | 6 June 1797 |
An act for dividing and enclosing the open and common fields, meadows, pastures, waste lands, and other commonable lands and grounds, in the parish of Southill, in the county of Bedford.
| Knipton Inclosure Act 1797 | 37 Geo. 3. c. 111 Pr. | 6 June 1797 |
An act for dividing and enclosing the open common fields, and other commonable lands, within the parish of Knipton, in the county of Leicester.
| Hinton Martell, &c. Inclosure Act 1797 | 37 Geo. 3. c. 112 Pr. | 6 June 1797 |
An act for dividing, allotting, and enclosing, the open and common fields, and other commonable lands and grounds, within the parishes of Hinton Martel and Gussage All Saints, in the county of Dorset.
| Harrold Inclosure Act 1797 | 37 Geo. 3. c. 113 Pr. | 6 June 1797 |
An act for dividing, allotting, and enclosing, the common and open fields, meadows, commonable lands, and waste grounds and places, in the parish of Harrold, in the county of Bedford.
| Stoke Mandeville Inclosure Act 1797 | 37 Geo. 3. c. 114 Pr. | 6 June 1797 |
An act for dividing and enclosing the open and common fields, common meadows, and other commonable lands, within the parish of Stoke Mandeville, in the county of Buckingham.
| Kerry Inclosure Act 1797 | 37 Geo. 3. c. 115 Pr. | 6 June 1797 |
An act for dividing and enclosing the waste lands, within the manor of Kerry, in the county of Montgomery.
| Harrow School's Exchange Act 1797 | 37 Geo. 3. c. 116 Pr. | 19 June 1797 |
An act for effectuating an exchange between the governors of the free grammer school of Harrow on the Hill, in the county of Middlesex, and John Hunter, of Gubbins, in the county of Hertford, esquire, of a farm and certain lands, in the parishes of North and South Mims, in the said counties of Hertford and Middlesex, for a farm and certain lands in the parish of Harrow on the Hill aforesaid.
| Fraser's Estate Act 1797 | 37 Geo. 3. c. 117 Pr. | 19 June 1797 |
An act for empowering the judges of the court of session in Scotland to sell the superiorities of the lands holden blench or in feu of the estate of Lovat, together with the feu and other duties payable by the vassals of proprietors of such lands to the heir of entail of the said estate, and also such parts and portions of the entailed estate of Lovat, and others, in the county of Inverness, belonging to the honourable lieutenant general Simon Fraser of Lovat, now deceased, as shall be sufficient for payment of the debts contracted by him, and affecting the said lands and estate, and for vesting the remainder in the heirs of entail named by the said lieutenant general Simon Fraser, subject to the limitations and provisions of his deeds of entail.
| Buckley's Estate Act 1797 | 37 Geo. 3. c. 118 Pr. | 19 June 1797 |
An act for sale of part of the estates comprised in the marriage settlement of Edward Buckley esquire, and Elizabeth his wife, in order to pay off an incumbrance affecting the same, and for other purposes therein mentioned.
| Pigot's Estate Act 1797 | 37 Geo. 3. c. 119 Pr. | 19 June 1797 |
An act for the better enabling the trustees to sell and dispose of the remaining estates of the late Robert Piggot esquire, situate in the several parishes, townships, hamlets, fields, precincts, and territories, of Peplow, Hodnett, Little Bolas, and Stoke upon Tern, in the county of Salop.
| Langley's Estate Act 1797 | 37 Geo. 3. c. 120 Pr. | 19 June 1797 |
An act for discharging certain estates comprised in the marriage settlement of Richard Langley esquire, from the uses thereby limited, and for settling other estates in lieu thereof.
| St. Giles and Risby, &c. Advowsons Act 1797 | 37 Geo. 3. c. 121 Pr. | 19 June 1797 |
An act for exchanging the advowson of the vicarage of the abbey church, otherwise holy cross, with Saint Giles annexed, in the county of Salop, belonging to his Majesty, for the advowsons of the churches of Risby and Fornham Saint Genovesse, otherwise Saint Genoveve, in the county of Suffolk belonging to the right honourable Thomas Noel lord Berwick.
| Wark Inclosure Act 1797 | 37 Geo. 3. c. 122 Pr. | 19 June 1797 |
An act for dividing, allotting, and enclosing a certain common moor or tract of waste ground, called Wark Common, lying wholly or partly within the barony or manor of Wark, in the parish of Carham, in the county of Northumberland.
| Blankney, &c. Inclosure Act 1797 | 37 Geo. 3. c. 123 Pr. | 19 June 1797 |
An act for dividing and enclosing the open common fields, half years meadow land, heath, commons, and waste grounds in the parishes of Blankney and Scopwick, in the county of Lincoln.
| Settrington Inclosure Act 1797 | 37 Geo. 3. c. 124 Pr. | 19 June 1797 |
An act for dividing, allotting, and inclosing certain open fields, common pastures, commons, or waste grounds, within the manor of Settrington, in the east riding of the county of York.
| Oxhill Inclosure Act 1797 | 37 Geo. 3. c. 125 Pr. | 19 June 1797 |
An act for dividing and enclosing the open and common fields, and other commonable land and ground, within the parish of Oxhill, in the county of Warwick.
| Moorlinch Inclosure Act 1797 | 37 Geo. 3. c. 126 Pr. | 19 June 1797 |
An act for dividing and allotting certain open and commonable pastures, and for exchanging, allotting, and improving, certain open and commonable arable lands, within the parish of Moorlince, in the county of Somerset.
| Schedel's Naturalization Act 1797 | 37 Geo. 3. c. 127 Pr. | 19 June 1797 |
An act for naturalizing Henry Lewis Schedel.
| Soilleux's Naturalization Act 1797 | 37 Geo. 3. c. 128 Pr. | 19 June 1797 |
An act for naturalizing Jean Nicholas Joseph Soileux.
| Heisch and Maüe's Naturalization Act 1797 | 37 Geo. 3. c. 129 Pr. | 19 June 1797 |
An act for naturalizing Frederick Heisch and John Jacob Maüe.
| Southcote's Estate Act 1797 | 37 Geo. 3. c. 130 Pr. | 4 July 1797 |
An act for vesting the manors, and other hereditaments situate in the county of Cambridge, devised by the will of Bridget Southcote widow deceased, in trustees for sale, and for laying out the money arising from the sale thereof in estates in the county of Norfolk, to be settled to the uses devised by the said will of the said Bridget Southcote.
| Selby Inclosure Act 1797 | 37 Geo. 3. c. 131 Pr. | 4 July 1797 |
An act for dividing, allotting, and enclosing, the commons and waste grounds, within the manor and parish of Selby, in the west riding of the county of York.
| Vassall's Divorce Act 1797 | 37 Geo. 3. c. 132 Pr. | 4 July 1797 |
An act to dissolve the marriage of sir Godfrey Vassall (lately called sir Godfrey Webster) baronet, with Elizabeth Vassall his now wife, and to enable him to marry again, and for other purposes therein mentioned.
| Earl of Bradford's Estate Act 1797 | 37 Geo. 3. c. 133 Pr. | 19 July 1797 |
An act for vesting in trustees certain parts of the late earl of Bradford's estates, in the county of Salop, devised by the will of general Harry Pulteney, for the purpose of effecting an exchange thereof with the right honourable Thomas Noel lord Berwick, and for settling the estates to be taken in exchange to the like uses and manner as the said earl of Bradford's estates, in the said county of Salop, are now settled.
| Pinney's Estate Act 1797 | 37 Geo. 3. c. 134 Pr. | 19 July 1797 |
An act for vesting the freehold and leasehold, or chattelhold estates, respectively, comprised in the marriage settlement of John Pinney esquire, and Elizabeth his wife, and situate in the county of Somerset, in the said John Pinney, his heirs, executors, administrators, and assigns, discharged from the uses and trusts by such settlement limited and declared of the same, and for settling divers other freehold and leasehold or chattelhold messuages, farms, lands, and hereditaments, of greater value, situate in the county of Dorset, in lieu thereof.
| Hoghton's Estate Act 1797 | 37 Geo. 3. c. 135 Pr. | 19 July 1797 |
An act for appointing trustees for carrying into execution certain trusts and powers contained in the will of the late sir Henry Houghton baronet, in the room of Samuel Fenton merchant, and Thomas Fenton esquire, the trustees therein named, who departed this life, in the life time of the said sir Henry Houghton, and for enabling the said trustees to exchange part of the lands thereby devised for lands of which sir Henry Philip Houghton, or Daniel Houghton, or either of them, are or is seised in fee simple, and for enabling the tenants for life under the said will, to make conveyances in fee and leases for long terms of years, for the purpose of building.
| Horton Inclosure Act 1797 | 37 Geo. 3. c. 136 Pr. | 19 July 1797 |
An act for dividing, allotting, and enclosing, the open common fields, commons and waste lands, within the parish of Horton, in the county of Gloucester.
| Weston Inclosure Act 1797 | 37 Geo. 3. c. 137 Pr. | 19 July 1797 |
An act for dividing and enclosing the open and common fields, common meadows, common pastures, and other commonable lands and waste grounds, in the parish of Weston, in the county of Hertford.
| Hillam Inclosure Act 1797 | 37 Geo. 3. c. 138 Pr. | 19 July 1797 |
An act for dividing, allotting, and enclosing, the open common fields, commons, and waste grounds, within the manor and township of Hillam, in the parish of Monk Fryftone, in the west riding of the county of York.
| Adstock Inclosure Act 1797 | 37 Geo. 3. c. 139 Pr. | 19 July 1797 |
An act for dividing and enclosing the open and common fields, meadows, and pastures, of and within the manor and parish of Adstock, in the county of Buckingham.
| Drayton Parslow Inclosure Act 1797 | 37 Geo. 3. c. 140 Pr. | 19 July 1797 |
An act for dividing, allotting, and enclosing, the open and common fields, common meadows, common pastures, and other commonable and waste lands, in the parish of Drayton Parslow, in the county of Buckingham.
| Raunds Inclosure Act 1797 | 37 Geo. 3. c. 141 Pr. | 19 July 1797 |
An act for dividing and enclosing the common and open fields, meadows, commonable lands and waste grounds, in Raunds, in the county of Northampton.
| King's Walden Inclosure Act 1797 | 37 Geo. 3. c. 142 Pr. | 19 July 1797 |
An act for dividing and enclosing the open and common fields, common pastures, and other commonable lands and waste grounds in the parish of King's Walden, in the county of Hertford.
| Bolton Percy Inclosure Act 1797 | 37 Geo. 3. c. 143 Pr. | 19 July 1797 |
An act for dividing, allotting, and enclosing, or stinting, certain open common fields, ing lands, commons, and commonable places, within the parish of Bolton Percy, in the county of the city of York.
| Croydon Inclosure Act 1797 | 37 Geo. 3. c. 144 Pr. | 19 July 1797 |
An act for dividing, allotting, and enclosing, the open and common fields, common meadows, common marshes, heaths, wastes, and commonable woods, lands, and grounds, within the parish of Croydon, in the county of Surrey.
| Greatford Inclosure Act 1797 | 37 Geo. 3. c. 145 Pr. | 19 July 1797 |
An act for dividing, allotting, and enclosing, the open and common fields, common meadows, common pastures, and other commonable lands and grounds, within the parish of Greatford, in the county of Lincoln.
| Pontefract Inclosure Act 1797 | 37 Geo. 3. c. 146 Pr. | 19 July 1797 |
An act for dividing, allotting, and enclosing, certain open and intermixed lands and grounds within the township of Pontefract, in the west riding of the county of York, and making compensation for the great tithes of the said lands, and other lands in the townships of Pontefract, Tanshelf, and Carlton, within the parish of Pontefract, and also for the vicarial tythes of the said parish.
| Cheverell Inclosure Act 1797 | 37 Geo. 3. c. 147 Pr. | 19 July 1797 |
An act for dividing and allotting the open and commonable lands and grounds within the several parishes of Great Chiverell and Little Chiverell, in the county of Wilts.
| Eynesbury Inclosure Act 1797 | 37 Geo. 3. c. 148 Pr. | 19 July 1797 |
An act for dividing and enclosing certain open and common fields, meadows, lands, commons, and commonable places, within the parish of Eynesbury, in the county of Huntingdon.
| Teast's Divorce Act 1797 | 37 Geo. 3. c. 149 Pr. | 19 July 1797 |
An act to dissolve the marriage of Sidenham Teast merchant, with Eleanor Buckle, his now wife, and to enable him to marry again, and for other purposes therein mentioned.
| Dubois' Naturalization Act 1797 | 37 Geo. 3. c. 150 Pr. | 19 July 1797 |
An act for naturalizing Nicholas Dubois De Chemant.
| Tempest's Estate Act 1797 | 37 Geo. 3. c. 151 Pr. | 20 July 1797 |
An act for vesting in a new trustee the sum of forty thousand pounds given by a codicil annexed to the will of John Tempest esquire, to Farrer Wren, and Robert Shafto esquires, upon certain trusts in the said codicil mentioned.

=== Sources ===
- Pickering, Danby, ed. (1797). "Anno regni tricesimo septimo Georgii III". The Statutes at Large. Vol. 41. pp. 191–498 – via Google Books.
- Pickering, Danby, ed. (1797). "Anno regni tricesimo septimo Georgii III". The Statutes at Large. Vol. 41. pp. 191–498 – via Internet Archive.
- Journals of the House of Commons. Vol. 52. London: His Majesty's Stationery Office. 1803. pp. 7–756 – via Google Books.
- Chronological Table of and Index to the Statutes. Vol. 1: To the End of the Session 59 Vict. Sess. 2 (1895) (13th ed.). London: Her Majesty's Stationery Office. 1896. pp. 159–162 – via Google Books.
- "Acts of the Parliament of Great Britain from 1797". legislation.gov.uk. The National Archives.

== 38 Geo. 3 ==
The second session of the 18th Parliament of Great Britain, which met from 2 November 1797 until 29 June 1798.

This session was also traditionally cited as 38 G. 3.

=== Public general acts ===
| Short title | Citation | Royal assent |
Long title
| Restriction on Cash Payments (No. 2) Act 1797 or the Bank Restriction Act 1797 (repealed) | 38 Geo. 3. c. 1 | 30 November 1797 |
An Act to amend and continue, until one month after the conclusion of the present war, the provisions contained in an act, passed in the session of parliament of the thirty-sixth and thirty-seventh years of his present Majesty, chapter ninety-one, (Note: Restrictions on Cash Payments Act 1797 (37 Geo. 3. c. 91)) videlicet, on the twenty second of June one thousand seven hundred and ninety-seven, for the restriction on payments of cash by the bank. (Repealed by Resumption of Cash Payments, etc. Act 1819 (59 Geo. 3. c. 49))
| Issue of Bank Notes (Scotland) Act 1797 (repealed) | 38 Geo. 3. c. 2 | 30 November 1797 |
An act to continue, until the expiration of thirty days after the commencement of the next session of parliament, an act passed in the session of parliament of the thirty-sixth and thirty-seventh years of his present Majesty, c. 137, viz. on July 20, 1797, (Note: Banks (Scotland) (No. 3) Act 1797 (37 Geo. 3. c. 137)) intituled, "An act to continue an act, made in this present session of parliament, (Note: Banks (Scotland) (No. 2) Act 1797 (37 Geo. 3. c. 62)) intituled, 'An act to revive and continue for a limited time, and amend an act passed in the present session of parliament, (Note: Banks (Scotland) Act 1797 (37 Geo. 3. c. 137)) intituled, "An act to allow the banks, and certain banking companies, in that part of Great Britain called Scotland, to issue notes for dums under a certain amount, for a limited time; and for indemnifying all persons who have issued notes for small sums of money in that part of the united kingdom," for a limited time. (Repealed by Statute Law Revision Act 1871 (34 & 35 Vict. c. 116))
| Importation (No. 3) Act 1797 (repealed) | 38 Geo. 3. c. 3 | 30 November 1797 |
An act to continue until March 1, 1799, an act passed in the session of parliament of the thirty-sixth and thirty-seventh years of his present Majesty, c. 72, (Note: Importation Act 1797 (37 Geo. 3. c. 72)) viz. on June 6, 1797, for prohibiting the importation of cambricks and French lawns into this kingdom, not being of the manufacture of Ireland, except for the purpose of being warehoused for exportation. (Repealed by Statute Law Revision Act 1871 (34 & 35 Vict. c. 116))
| Duties on Malt, etc. Act 1797 (repealed) | 38 Geo. 3. c. 4 | 30 November 1797 |
An act for continuing and granting to his Majesty certain duties upon malt, mum, cyder, and perry, for the service of the year 1798. (Repealed by Statute Law Revision Act 1871 (34 & 35 Vict. c. 116))
| Land Tax Act 1797 (repealed) | 38 Geo. 3. c. 5 | 30 November 1797 |
An act for granting an aid to his Majesty by a land tax to be raised in Great Britain for the service of the year 1798. (Repealed by Statute Law (Repeals) Act 1989 (c. 43))
| Army and Navy Act 1797 (repealed) | 38 Geo. 3. c. 6 | 2 December 1797 |
An act to continue, until the expiration of six weeks after the commencement of the next session of parliament, an act, passed in the session of parliament holden in the thirty-sixth and thirty-seventh years of his present Majesty, c. 70, (Note: Incitement to Mutiny Act 1797 (37 Geo. 3. c. 70)) viz. on June 6, 1797, for the better prevention and punishment of attempts to seduce persons serving in his Majesty's forces, by sea or land, from their duty and allegiance to his Majesty, or to incite them to mutiny or disobedience. (Repealed by Statute Law Revision Act 1871 (34 & 35 Vict. c. 116))
| Negotiation of Notes and Bills (No. 3) Act 1797 (repealed) | 38 Geo. 3. c. 7 | 2 December 1797 |
An act to continue, until the expiration of six weeks after the commencement of the next session of parliament, two several acts passed in the session of parliament holden in the thirty-sixth and thirty-seventh years of his present Majesty, the one, c. 32, (Note: Negotiation of Notes and Bills Act 1797 (37 Geo. 3. c. 32)) on March 10, and the other, c. 61, (Note: Negotiation of Notes and Bills (No. 2) Act 1797 (37 Geo. 3. c. 61)) on May 25, 1797, for suspending, for a limited time, the operation of certain acts made in the fifteenth and seventeenth years of the reign of his present Majesty, for restraining the negociation of promissory notes and bills of exchange, under a limited sum, within that part of Great Britain called England. (Repealed by Statute Law Revision Act 1871 (34 & 35 Vict. c. 116))
| Loans or Exchequer Bills (No. 2) Act 1797 (repealed) | 38 Geo. 3. c. 8 | 30 December 1797 |
An act for raising a certain sum of money, by loans or exchequer bills, for the service of the year 1798. (Repealed by Statute Law Revision Act 1871 (34 & 35 Vict. c. 116))
| Continuance of Laws (No. 2) Act 1797 (repealed) | 38 Geo. 3. c. 9 | 30 December 1797 |
An act to continue, until the expiration of six weeks after the commencement of the next session of parliament, an act passed in the thirty-fifth year of his present Majesty, c. 15. (Note: Importation Act 1795 (35 Geo. 3. c. 15)) viz on March 16, 1795, and also an act passed in the same year, c. 80. (Note: Shipping Act 1795 (35 Geo. 3. c. 80)) viz. on May 22, 1795, and also another act, passed in the thirty-sixth year of his present Majesty, c. 76, (Note: Merchandise in Neutral Ships Act 1796 (36 Geo. 3. c. 76)) viz. May 14, 1796, relating to the admission of certain articles of merchandize in neutral ships, and the issuing of orders in council for that purpose; and to continue, for the same period, an act, passed in the session of parliament holden in the thirty-sixth and thirty-seventh years of his present Majesty, c. 21, (Note: Cape of Good Hope Trade Act 1796 (37 Geo. 3. c. 21)) viz. on Dec. 28, 1796, authorising his Majesty to make regulations respecting the trade and commerce to and from the Cape of Good Hope. (Repealed by Statute Law Revision Act 1871 (34 & 35 Vict. c. 116))
| Exportation (No. 2) Act 1797 (repealed) | 38 Geo. 3. c. 10 | 30 December 1797 |
An act to continue, until the expiration of six weeks from the commencement of the next session of parliament, so much of an act, passed in the session of parliament of the thirty-sixth and thirty-seventh years of his present Majesty, c. 7, (Note: Exportation and Importation Act 1796 (37 Geo. 3. c. 7)) viz. on Nov. 11, 1796, as relates to the exportation and carrying coastwise of wheat and rye, and to the importation of several articles of provision. (Repealed by Statute Law Revision Act 1871 (34 & 35 Vict. c. 116))
| Duties on Distilleries Act 1797 (repealed) | 38 Geo. 3. c. 11 | 30 December 1797 |
An act to revive and continue, until March 1, 1798, an act passed in the session of parliament holden in the thirty-sixth and thirty-seventh years of his present Majesty, c. 102, (Note: Scotch Distilleries Act 1797 (37 Geo. 3. c. 102)) viz. on July 19, 1797, for granting to his Majesty additional duties on distilleries in the several parts of the highlands of Scotland therein particularly described, for a limited time; and for regulating the duties on distilleries in the respective districts in Scotland. (Repealed by Statute Law Revision Act 1871 (34 & 35 Vict. c. 116))
| Militia (No. 2) Act 1797 (repealed) | 38 Geo. 3. c. 12 | 30 December 1797 |
An act to give further time for executing, and for enlarging, the powers of an act, made in the last session of parliament, intituled, "An act to raise and embody a militia force in that part of the kingdom of Great Britain called Scotland." (Note: Militia Act 1797 (37 Geo. 3. c. 103)) (Repealed by Statute Law Revision Act 1871 (34 & 35 Vict. c. 116))
| Augmentation of 60th Regiment Act 1797 (repealed) | 38 Geo. 3. c. 13 | 30 December 1797 |
An act to amend an act made in the twenty-ninth year of the reign of his late majesty King George the Second, intituled, "An act to enable his Majesty to grant commissions to a certain number of foreign protestants, who have served abroad as officers or engineers, to act and rank as officers or engineers in America only, under certain restrictions and qualifications." (Note: Commissions to Foreign Protestants Act 1756 (29 Geo. 2. c. 5)) (Repealed by Statute Law Revision Act 1861 (24 & 25 Vict. c. 101))
| Indemnity (No. 2) Act 1797 (repealed) | 38 Geo. 3. c. 14 | 30 December 1797 |
An act to indemnify such persons as have omitted to qualify themselves for offices and employments; and to indemnify justices of the peace, or others, who have omitted to register or deliver in their qualifications within the time directed by law, and for extending the time limitted for those purposes until Dec. 25, 1798; to indemnify members and officers, in cities, corporations, and borough towns, whose admissions have been omitted to be stamped according to law or having been stamped have been lost or mislaid and for allowing them until Dec. 25, 1798, to provide admissions duly stamped; to permit such persons as have omitted to make and file affidavits of the execution of indentures of clerks to attornies and solicitors, to make and file the same on or before the first day of Michaelmas term, 1798; and for indemnifying deputy lieutenants and officers of the militia, who have neglected to transmit descriptions of their qualifications to the clerks of the peace within the time directed by law, and for extending the time limited for that purpose until Sept. 1, 1798. (Repealed by Promissory Oaths Act 1871 (34 & 35 Vict. c. 48))
| Marine Mutiny (No. 2) Act 1797 (repealed) | 38 Geo. 3. c. 15 | 30 December 1797 |
An act for the regulation of his Majesty's marine forces while on shore, to continue until March 25, 1799. (Repealed by Statute Law Revision Act 1871 (34 & 35 Vict. c. 116))

=== Local acts ===
| Short title | Citation | Royal assent |
Long title
| All Saints Church, Southampton Act 1797 | 38 Geo. 3. c. i (Note: This was the first ever 'local' act.) | 30 December 1797 |
To amend two acts, made in the thirty-first (Note: All Saints Church, Southampton Act 1791 (31 Geo. 3. c. 71)) and thirty-third (Note: All Saints' Church, Southampton Act 1793 (33 Geo. 3. c. 101)) years of the reign of his present Majesty, for taking down and rebuilding the parish church of All Saints within the town and county of the town of Southampton.

=== Sources ===
- Pickering, Danby, ed. (1797). "Anno regni tricesimo octavo Georgii III". The Statutes at Large. Vol. 41. pp. 523–534 – via Google Books.
- Journals of the House of Commons. Vol. 53. London: His Majesty's Stationery Office. 1803. pp. 3–172 – via Google Books.
- Chronological Table of and Index to the Statutes. Vol. 1: To the End of the Session 59 Vict. Sess. 2 (1895) (13th ed.). London: Her Majesty's Stationery Office. 1896. pp. 162–163 – via Google Books.

== See also ==
- List of acts of the Parliament of Great Britain
