= Act of Parliament clock =

Large wall clock originally hung in UK inns and taverns

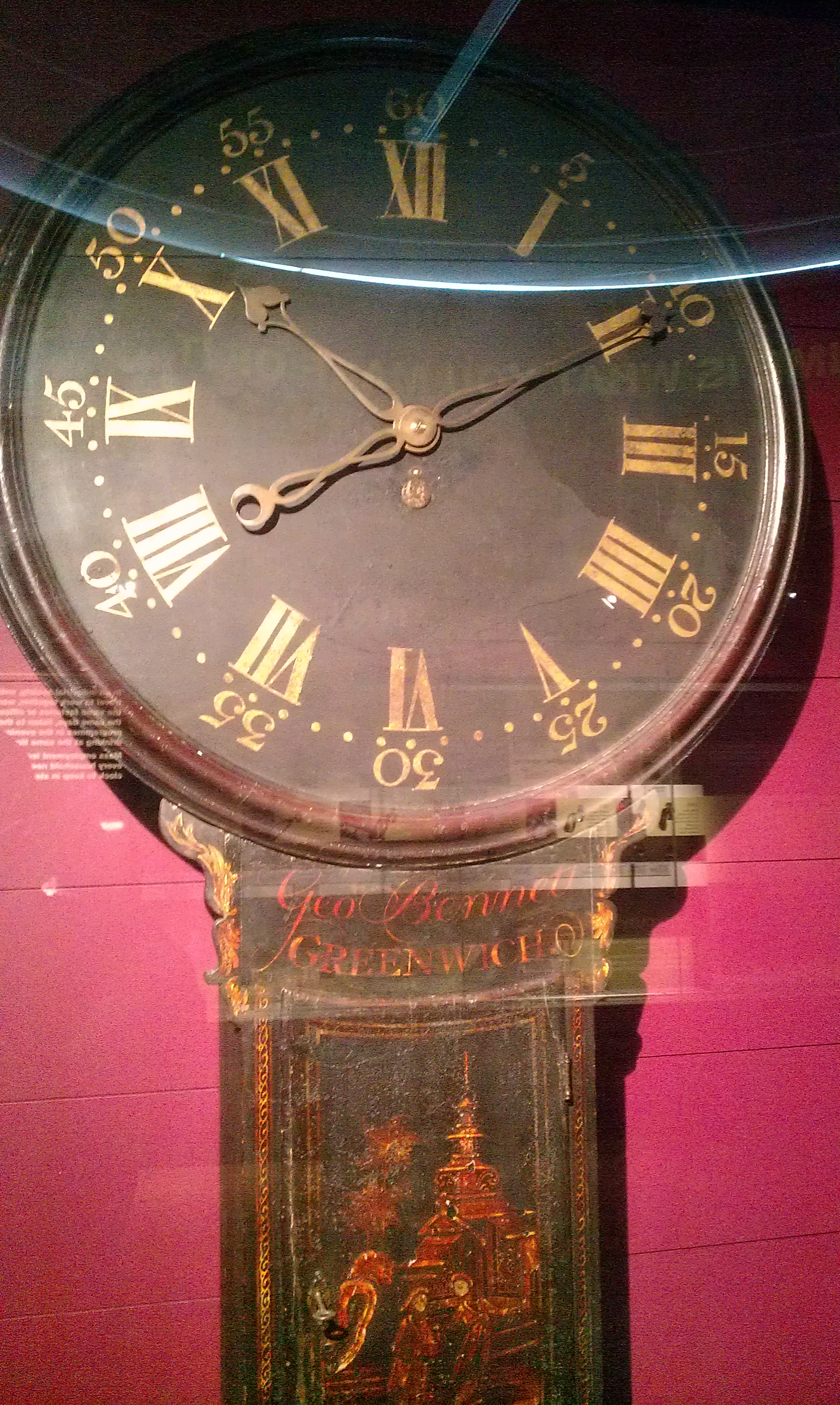
Act of Parliament clock at a museum in Greenwich

An Act of Parliament clock, also commonly known as a tavern clock, is a type of large clock originally hung in inns and taverns in the United Kingdom, beginning in the mid-18th century. Such clocks were plain in design, the faces were around two to five feet in diameter, and they were hung on the wall.

The term Act of Parliament clock came about long after these clocks were already in existence. In 1797, a tax against clocks of five shillings was introduced in the Kingdom of Great Britain by the prime minister William Pitt. The tax was very unpopular among clockmakers and was repealed after nine months. The large clocks in inns were later widely (though incorrectly) said to have been developed as a response to this tax.

== See also ==
- List of public house topics
