= Duties on Clocks and Watches Act 1797 =

Act of the Parliament of Great Britain

- Act of Parliament
- Parliament of Great Britain
- Long title: An Act for granting to his Majesty certain duties on clocks and watches.
- Citation: 37 Geo. 3. c. 108
- Territorial extent: Great Britain

Dates
- Royal assent: 19 July 1797
- Commencement: 5 July 1797 (Note: Section 1.)
- Repealed: 6 August 1861
Other legislation
Amended by	Inhabited House, etc., Duties Act 1798
Repealed by	Statute Law Revision Act 1861

Status: Repealed

Text of statute as originally enacted

The Duties on Clocks and Watches Act 1797 (37 Geo. 3. c. 108) was an act of the Parliament of Great Britain.

During the last three decades of the eighteenth century, the price of watches declined and consequently they increased in popularity. William Pitt, the Prime Minister and Chancellor of the Exchequer, decided to tax watches and clocks. The act taxed gold watches at 10 shillings and silver and other metal watches at 2s. 6d. The act also required makers or dealers in watches and clocks to purchase an annual license, costing 2s. 6d. in London and 1 shilling elsewhere.

However, the tax was a failure. It nearly ruined the manufacturers of clocks and watches, with demand for their products declining to such an extent that within a year the manufacture of these items diminished by half. It also caused thousands of workers employed in these trades to emigrate. Consequently, Pitt repealed the tax in April 1798.

== Subsequent developments ==
The whole act was repealed by section 1 of, and the schedule to, the Statute Law Revision Act 1861 (24 & 25 Vict. c. 101), which came into force on 6 August 1861.

== See also ==
- Act of Parliament clock
