= Evidence Act =

Stock short title used for legislation

Evidence Act (with its variations) is a stock short title used for legislation in Australia, India, Malaysia and the United Kingdom relating to evidence. The Bill for an Act with this short title will have been known as a Evidence Bill during its passage through Parliament.

Evidence Acts may be a generic name either for legislation bearing that short title or for all legislation which relates to evidence.

== List ==
=== Australia ===
- The Evidence Act 1995.

=== India ===
- The Indian Evidence Act, 1872

=== Malaysia ===
- The Evidence Act 1950

=== New Zealand ===
- The Evidence Act 2006

=== United Kingdom ===
- The Shop-books Evidence Act 1609 (7 Jas. 1. c. 12)
- The Evidence (Proceedings in other Jurisdictions) Act 1975 (c. 34)
- The Police and Criminal Evidence Act 1984 (c. 60)
- The Criminal Evidence (Witness Anonymity) Act 2008 (c. 15)

The Evidence Acts 1806 to 1895 is the collective title of the following acts:

- The Witnesses Act 1806 (46 Geo. 3. c. 37)
- The Evidence (Ireland) Act 1815 (55 Geo. 3. c. 157)
- The Divorce Bills Evidence Act 1820 (1 Geo. 4. c. 101)
- The Evidence by Commission Act 1831 (1 Will. 4. c. 22)
- The Previous Conviction Act 1836 (6 & 7 Will. 4. c. 111)
- The Evidence (Scotland) Act 1840 (3 & 4 Vict. c. 59)
- The (Colonies) Evidence Act 1843 (6 & 7 Vict. c. 22)
- The Evidence on Commission Act 1843 (6 & 7 Vict. c. 82)
- The Evidence Act 1843 (6 & 7 Vict. c. 85)
- The Evidence Act 1845 (8 & 9 Vict. c. 113)
- The Evidence Act 1851 (14 & 15 Vict. c. 99)
- The Evidence (Scotland) Act 1852 (15 & 16 Vict. c. 27)
- The Evidence (Scotland) Act 1853 (16 & 17 Vict. c. 20)
- The Evidence Amendment Act 1853 (16 & 17 Vict. c. 83)
- The Foreign Tribunals Evidence Act 1856 (19 & 20 Vict. c. 113)
- The Evidence by Commission Act 1859 (22 Vict. c. 20)
- The British Law Ascertainment Act 1859 (22 & 23 Vict. c. 63)
- The Foreign Law Ascertainment Act 1861 (24 & 25 Vict. c. 11)
- The Evidence (Scotland) Act 1866 (29 & 30 Vict. c. 112)
- The Documentary Evidence Act 1868 (31 & 32 Vict. c. 37)
- The Evidence Further Amendment Act 1869 (32 & 33 Vict. c. 68)
- The Evidence Further Amendment (Scotland) Act 1874 (37 & 38 Vict. c. 64)
- The Evidence Act 1877 (40 & 41 Vict. c. 14)
- The Documentary Evidence Act 1882 (45 & 46 Vict. c. 9)
- The Evidence by Commission Act 1885 (48 & 49 Vict. c. 74)
- The Documentary Evidence Act 1895 (58 & 59 Vict. c. 9)

=== United States ===
- The Foundations for Evidence-Based Policymaking Act (Pub. L. 115–435)

== See also ==
- List of short titles
