= List of acts of the 4th session of the 2nd Parliament of the United Kingdom =

This is a complete list of acts of the 4th session of the 2nd Parliament of the United Kingdom which had regnal year 46 Geo. 3. This session met from 21 January 1806 until 23 July 1806.

== 1806 ==
The fourth session of the 2nd Parliament of the United Kingdom, which met from 21 January 1806 until 23 July 1806.

This session was also traditionally cited as 46 G. 3.

=== Public general acts ===
Short title	Citation	Royal assent
Long title
Auditor of the Exchequer Act 1806 (repealed)	46 Geo. 3. c. 1	7 February 1806
An Act to empower the auditor of the Exchequer to constitute a trustee for the execution of the said office in the case therein mentioned. (Repealed by 4 & 5 Will. 4. c. 15)
Malt Duties Act 1806 (repealed)	46 Geo. 3. c. 2	12 February 1806
An Act for continuing and granting to his Majesty certain duties upon malt in Great Britain for the service of the year one thousand eight hundred and six. (Repealed by Statute Law Revision Act 1872 (35 & 36 Vict. c. 63))
Duties on Pensions, etc. Act 1806 (repealed)	46 Geo. 3. c. 3	12 February 1806
An Act for continuing and granting to his Majesty a duty on pensions, offices, and personal estates, in England; and certain duties on sugar, malt, tobacco, and snuff in Great Britain, for the service of the year one thousand eight hundred and six. (Repealed by Statute Law Revision Act 1872 (35 & 36 Vict. c. 63))
Annuity to Lady Nelson Act 1806 (repealed)	46 Geo. 3. c. 4	28 February 1806
An Act to enable his Majesty to grant a certain annuity to Lady Viscountess Nelson, in consideration of the eminent services performed by the late vice-admiral Lord Viscount Nelson to his Majesty and the publick. (Repealed by Statute Law Revision Act 1872 (35 & 36 Vict. c. 63))
Annuity to Sir Richard Strachan Act 1806 (repealed)	46 Geo. 3. c. 5	28 February 1806
An Act to enable his Majesty to grant a certain annuity to rear-admiral Sir Richard Strachan baronet, in consideration of the eminent services which he has rendered to his Majesty and the publick. (Repealed by Statute Law Revision Act 1872 (35 & 36 Vict. c. 63))
Loans or Exchequer Bills Act 1806 (repealed)	46 Geo. 3. c. 6	28 February 1806
An Act for raising the sum of five millions by loans or exchequer bills for the service of Great Britain for the year one thousand eight hundred and six. (Repealed by Statute Law Revision Act 1872 (35 & 36 Vict. c. 63))
Indemnity Act 1806 (repealed)	46 Geo. 3. c. 7	22 March 1806
An Act to indemnify such persons in the United Kingdom as have omitted to qualify themselves for offices and employments; and for extending the times limited for those purposes respectively, until the twenty-fifth day of December one thousand eight hundred and six, and to permit such persons in Great Britain as have omitted to make and file affidavits of the execution of indentures of clerks to attornies and solicitors, to make and file the same on or before the first day of Michaelmas term one thousand eight hundred and six. (Repealed by Promissory Oaths Act 1871 (34 & 35 Vict. c. 48))
Marine Mutiny Act 1806 (repealed)	46 Geo. 3. c. 8	22 March 1806
An Act for the regulation of his Majesty's royal marine forces while on shore. (Repealed by Statute Law Revision Act 1872 (35 & 36 Vict. c. 63))
Greenland Whale Fishery Act 1806 (repealed)	46 Geo. 3. c. 9	22 March 1806
An Act for allowing, until the signature of preliminary articles of peace, vessels employed in the Greenland whale-fishery to complete their full number of men at certain ports. (Repealed by Customs Law Repeal Act 1825 (6 Geo. 4. c. 105))
Drawbacks upon Sugar Act 1806 (repealed)	46 Geo. 3. c. 10	22 March 1806
An Act for further continuing until the twenty-fifth day of March one thousand eight hundred and seven, an act passed in the forty-third year of his present Majesty, (Note: Drawbacks and Bounties Act 1802 (43 Geo. 3. c. 11)) for discontinuing certain drawbacks and bounties on the exportation of sugar from Great Britain, and for allowing other drawbacks and bounties in lieu thereof. (Repealed by Statute Law Revision Act 1872 (35 & 36 Vict. c. 63))
Exportation Act 1806 (repealed)	46 Geo. 3. c. 11	22 March 1806
An Act for allowing the Exportation of Corn and other Articles for the Use of His Majesty's Forces and Garrisons. (Repealed by Statute Law Revision Act 1861 (24 & 25 Vict. c. 101))
Duties and Drawbacks (Ireland) Act 1806 (repealed)	46 Geo. 3. c. 12	22 March 1806
An Act to continue several Acts for granting certain Rates and Duties, and allowing certain Drawbacks and Bounties, on Goods, Wares and Merchandize, imported into and exported from Ireland; and for granting a Duty upon Malt and Spirits made and distilled in Ireland, until the Twenty ninth Day of September One thousand eight hundred and six; and for granting certain Inland Duties of Excise and Taxes in Ireland, until the Twenty fifth Day of March One thousand eight hundred and seven. (Repealed by Statute Law Revision Act 1872 (35 & 36 Vict. c. 63))
Annuity to Lord Collingwood, etc. Act 1806 (repealed)	46 Geo. 3. c. 13	22 March 1806
An Act for settling and securing certain Annuities on Cuthbert Lord Collingwood, and the several other Persons therein described, (Note: The annuity passes to Lord Collingwood's next two male heirs, or to his wife, or to his daughters.) in Consideration of the signal and important Service performed by the said Cuthbert Lord Collingwood to His Majesty and the Public. (Repealed by Statute Law Revision Act 1872 (35 & 36 Vict. c. 63))
Drawbacks (Ireland) Act 1806 (repealed)	46 Geo. 3. c. 14	22 March 1806
An Act to continue, until the Twenty fifth Day of March One thousand eight hundred and seven, and to amend several Acts for regulating the Drawbacks and Bounties on the Exportation of Sugar from Ireland. (Repealed by Statute Law Revision Act 1872 (35 & 36 Vict. c. 63))
Mutiny Act 1806 (repealed)	46 Geo. 3. c. 15	22 March 1806
An Act for punishing mutiny and desertion; and for the better payment of the army and their quarters within the United Kingdom, and the islands of Jersey, Guernsey, Alderney, Sark, and Man. (Repealed by Statute Law Revision Act 1872 (35 & 36 Vict. c. 63))
Treaty of Commerce, etc., with America Act 1806 (repealed)	46 Geo. 3. c. 16	22 March 1806
An Act to continue until the First Day of June One thousand eight hundred and seven, and amend an Act passed in the thirty seventh Year of His present Majesty, for carrying into Execution the Treaty of Amity, Commerce and Navigation, between His Majesty and the United States of America. (Repealed by Statute Law Revision Act 1872 (35 & 36 Vict. c. 63))
Exportation (No. 2) Act 1806 (repealed)	46 Geo. 3. c. 17	22 March 1806
An Act to permit, until the Twenty fifth Day of March One thousand eight hundred and nine, the Exportation to the United Kingdom of Wool from the British Plantations in America. (Repealed by Statute Law Revision Act 1872 (35 & 36 Vict. c. 63))
Woollen Manufacture Act 1806 (repealed)	46 Geo. 3. c. 18	22 March 1806
An Act to continue until the Twenty fifth Day of March One thousand eight hundred and seven, the Operation of an Act passed in the last Session of Parliament, (Note: Woollen Manufacture Act 1805 (45 Geo. 3. c. 83)) to suspend Proceedings in Actions, Prosecutions and Proceedings, under certain Acts relating to the Woollen Manufacture, and also under an Act of Queen Elizabeth, (Note: Statute of Artificers 1562 (5 Eliz. 1. c. 4)) so far as the same relates to certain Persons employed or concerned in the said Manufacture. (Repealed by Statute Law Revision Act 1872 (35 & 36 Vict. c. 63))
Militia Pay (Great Britain) Act 1806 (repealed)	46 Geo. 3. c. 19	22 March 1806
An Act for defraying the Charge of the Pay and Clothing of the Militia in Great Britain for the Year One thousand eight hundred and six. (Repealed by Statute Law Revision Act 1872 (35 & 36 Vict. c. 63))
Militia Allowances Act 1806 (repealed)	46 Geo. 3. c. 20	22 March 1806
An Act to continue until the twenty-fifth day of March one thousand eight hundred and seven, and amend so much of an act made in the thirty-ninth and fortieth years of his present Majesty, (Note: Militia Allowances Act 1800 (39 & 40 Geo. 3. c. 44)) as grants certain allowances to adjutants and serjeant majors of the militia of England, disembodied under an act of the same session of parliament. (Note: Militia Act 1799 (39 & 40 Geo. 3. c. 1)) (Repealed by Statute Law Revision Act 1872 (35 & 36 Vict. c. 63))
Militia Allowances (No. 2) Act 1806 (repealed)	46 Geo. 3. c. 21	22 March 1806
An Act for making Allowances in certain Cases to Subaltern Officers of the Militia in Great Britain, while disembodied. (Repealed by Statute Law Revision Act 1872 (35 & 36 Vict. c. 63))
Militia Pay (Ireland) Act 1806 (repealed)	46 Geo. 3. c. 22	22 March 1806
An Act for defraying, until the Twenty fifth Day of March One thousand eight hundred and seven, the Charge of the Pay and Clothing of the Militia of Ireland; for holding Courts Martial on Serjeant Majors, Serjeants, Corporals and Drummers, for Offences committed during the Time such Militia shall not be embodied; and for making Allowances in certain Cases to Subaltern Officers of the said Militia during Peace. (Repealed by Statute Law Revision Act 1872 (35 & 36 Vict. c. 63))
Enlistment of Foreigners Act 1806 (repealed)	46 Geo. 3. c. 23	22 March 1806
An Act to extend the Provisions of an Act, passed in the Forty fourth Year of the Reign of His present Majesty, (Note: Enlistment of Foreigners Act 1804 (44 Geo. 3. c. 75)) for enabling Subjects of Foreign States to enlist as Soldiers in His Majesty's Service; and to indemnify those who have advised His Majesty to land such Soldiers in this Kingdom. (Repealed by Statute Law Revision Act 1872 (35 & 36 Vict. c. 63))
Payment of Creditors (Scotland) Act 1806 (repealed)	46 Geo. 3. c. 24	22 March 1806
An Act for further continuing, until the Twenty fifth Day of March One thousand eight hundred and eight, an Act made in the Thirty third Year of the Reign of His present Majesty, (Note: Payment of Creditors (Scotland) Act 1793 (33 Geo. 3. c. 74)) for rendering the Payment of Creditors more equal and expeditious in Scotland. (Repealed by Statute Law Revision Act 1872 (35 & 36 Vict. c. 63))
Loans or Exchequer Bills (No. 2) Act 1806 (repealed)	46 Geo. 3. c. 25	31 March 1806
An Act for raising the sum of ten millions five hundred thousand pounds, by loans or exchequer-bills, for the service of Great Britain for the year one thousand eight hundred and six. (Repealed by Statute Law Revision Act 1872 (35 & 36 Vict. c. 63))
Loans or Exchequer Bills (No. 3) Act 1806 (repealed)	46 Geo. 3. c. 26	31 March 1806
An Act for raising the Sum of One Million five hundred thousand Pounds, by Loans or Exchequer Bills, for the Service of Great Britain for the Year One thousand eight hundred and six. (Repealed by Statute Law Revision Act 1872 (35 & 36 Vict. c. 63))
Bonding of Spirits Act 1806 (repealed)	46 Geo. 3. c. 27	31 March 1806
An Act for continuing, until the Twenty fifth Day of March One thousand eight hundred and eleven, so much of an Act, made in the Fifteenth and Sixteenth Years of His late Majesty, (Note: Spirit Duties, etc. Act 1741 (15 Geo. 2. c. 25)) as relates to the landing of Rum or Spirits of the British Sugar Plantations before Payment of the Duties of Excise. (Repealed by Statute Law Revision Act 1872 (35 & 36 Vict. c. 63))
Transportation, etc. Act 1806 (repealed)	46 Geo. 3. c. 28	31 March 1806
An Act to continue until the twenty-fifth day of March one thousand eight hundred and thirteen, several laws relating to the transportation of felons and other offenders to temporary places of confinement in England and Scotland. (Repealed by Statute Law Revision Act 1872 (35 & 36 Vict. c. 63))
Continuance of Laws Act 1806 (repealed)	46 Geo. 3. c. 29	2 April 1806
An Act for reviving and continuing several laws of customs relating to the establishing courts of judicature in the island of Newfoundland; and to the prohibiting the exportation from, and permitting the importation to Great Britain, of corn; and for allowing the importation of other articles of provision, without payment of duty, until the twenty-fifth day of March one thousand eight hundred and nine; and for continuing several laws relating to the granting a bounty upon certain species of British and Irish linens exported from Great Britain, and taking off the duties on importation into Great Britain of foreign raw linen yarns made of flax; to the granting a bounty upon the importation into Great Britain of hemp, and rough and undressed flax, from his Majesty's colonies in America; and to the encouragement of the Greenland whale-fisheries; and for reviving and continuing several laws relating to the regulating the prices at which corn and grain may be exported from Great Britain to Ireland, and from Ireland to Great Britain; and to the admission to entry in Great Britain of oil and blubber of Newfoundland, taken by his Majesty's subjects carrying on the fishery from and residing in the said island; and for continuing an act of the twenty-third year of his present Majesty, (Note: Flax, etc., Manufacture Act 1783 (23 Geo. 3. c. 77)) for the more effectual encouragement of the manufactures of flax and cotton in Great Britain; and for reviving and continuing several laws relating to the permitting the importation into Great Britain of hides and other articles in foreign ships; and to the prohibiting the exportation from Ireland of corn or potatoes, or other provisions; and to the permitting the importation into Ireland of corn, fish, and provisions, without payment of duty, until the twenty-fifth day of March one thousand eight hundred and eight; and for reviving and continuing an act passed in the parliament of Ireland, in the twenty-fifth year of his present Majesty, (Note: Flaxen and Hempen Manufactures Act 1785 (25 Geo. 3. c. 12 (I))) for the encouragement of the flaxen and hempen manufactures of Ireland, until the twenty-fifth day of March one thousand eight hundred and twenty-seven; and for amending and further continuing an act made in the seventh year of his present Majesty, (Note: Importation, etc. Act 1766 (7 Geo. 3. c. 36)) for the free importation into Great Britain of cochineal and indigo, until the twenty-fifth day of March one thousand eight hundred and nine. (Repealed by Statute Law Revision Act 1872 (35 & 36 Vict. c. 63))
Cape of Good Hope Trade Act 1806 (repealed)	46 Geo. 3. c. 30	21 April 1806
An Act to authorise his Majesty until the twenty-fifth day of March one thousand eight hundred and seven, to make regulations respecting the trade and commerce to an from the Cape of Good Hope. (Repealed by Statute Law Revision Act 1872 (35 & 36 Vict. c. 63))
Militia (Ireland) Act 1806 (repealed)	46 Geo. 3. c. 31	21 April 1806
An Act to continue, until the Twenty fifth Day of March One thousand eight hundred and seven, an Act made in the Forty fourth Year of His present Majesty, (Note: Militia (Ireland) Act 1804 (44 Geo. 3. c. 32)) for empowering His Majesty to accept the Services of such Parts of His Militia Forces in Ireland as might voluntarily offer themselves to be employed in Great Britain. (Repealed by Statute Law Revision Act 1872 (35 & 36 Vict. c. 63))
Treasury Bills (Ireland) Act 1806 (repealed)	46 Geo. 3. c. 32	21 April 1806
An Act to enable the Commissioners of His Majesty's Treasury of Ireland to issue Treasury Bills on the Credit of such Aids or Supplies as have been or shall be granted by Parliament for the Service of Ireland for the Year One thousand eight hundred and six; and for making forth Duplicates of Treasury Bills lost or destroyed. (Repealed by Statute Law Revision Act 1872 (35 & 36 Vict. c. 63))
National Debt Act 1806 (repealed)	46 Geo. 3. c. 33	21 April 1806
An Act for raising the Sum of Twenty Millions by way of Annuities. (Repealed by Statute Law Revision Act 1870 (33 & 34 Vict. c. 69))
British Fisheries Act 1806 (repealed)	46 Geo. 3. c. 34	21 April 1806
An Act for further continuing until the Twenty fifth Day of March One thousand eight hundred and seven, an Act made in the Thirty ninth Year of His present Majesty, (Note: British Fisheries Society Act 1799 (39 Geo. 3. c. 100)) for the more effectual Encouragement of the British Fisheries. (Repealed by Sea Fisheries Act 1868 (31 & 32 Vict. c. 45))
Stamps (Ireland) Act 1806 (repealed)	46 Geo. 3. c. 35	5 May 1806
An Act to revive and amend so much of an act made in the forty-third year of his present Majesty, (Note: Stamps Act 1803 (43 Geo. 3. c. 21)) for granting certain stamp duties in Ireland, as provides for the exempting from the said duties, bank-notes and bank post-bills issued by the governor and company of the bank of Ireland. (Repealed by Statute Law Revision Act 1861 (24 & 25 Vict. c. 101))
Duty on Houses Act 1806 (repealed)	46 Geo. 3. c. 36	5 May 1806
An Act to repeal so much of an act of the last session of parliament, (Note: Excise and Taxes (Ireland) Act 1805 (45 Geo. 3. c. 19)) as charges a duty of three shillings upon certain tenements or dwelling-houses in Ireland. (Repealed by Statute Law Revision Act 1872 (35 & 36 Vict. c. 63))
Witnesses Act 1806	46 Geo. 3. c. 37	5 May 1806
An Act to declare the Law with respect to Witnesses refusing to answer.
Customs and Excise Act 1806 (repealed)	46 Geo. 3. c. 38	5 May 1806
An Act for repealing the several Duties of Customs upon Tea imported into Great Britain, and granting a Duty in lieu thereof; and for granting to His Majesty additional Duties of Excise on Tea. (Repealed by Statute Law Revision Act 1861 (24 & 25 Vict. c. 101))
Excise Act 1806 (repealed)	46 Geo. 3. c. 39	5 May 1806
An Act for granting to His Majesty, until Twelve Months after the Ratification of a Definitive Treaty of Peace, additional Duties of Excise on Tobacco and Snuff. (Repealed by Statute Law Revision Act 1872 (35 & 36 Vict. c. 63))
Annuity to Admiral Duckworth Act 1806 (repealed)	46 Geo. 3. c. 40	5 May 1806
An Act to enable his Majesty to grant a certain annuity to vice-admiral Sir John Thomas Duckworth, knight of the most honourable Order of the Bath, in consideration of the eminent services which he has rendered to his Majesty and the publick. (Repealed by Statute Law Revision Act 1872 (35 & 36 Vict. c. 63))
Loans or Exchequer Bills (No. 4) Act 1806 (repealed)	46 Geo. 3. c. 41	5 May 1806
An Act for raising the sum of three millions by loans or exchequer-bills, for the service of Great Britain for the year one thousand eight hundred and six. (Repealed by Statute Law Revision Act 1872 (35 & 36 Vict. c. 63))
Duties on Certain Goods Act 1806 (repealed)	46 Geo. 3. c. 42	5 May 1806
An Act for granting to his Majesty, during the present war, and for six months after the expiration thereof, by the ratification of a definitive treaty of peace, additional duties on certain goods, wares, and merchandize, imported into and exported from, or brought or carried coastwise within Great Britain. (Repealed by Statute Law Revision Act 1872 (35 & 36 Vict. c. 63))
Appraisers Licences Act 1806 (repealed)	46 Geo. 3. c. 43	5 May 1806
An act for granting to his Majesty certain stamp duties on appraisements and on licences to appraisers in Great Britain. (Repealed by Finance Act 1949 (12, 13 & 14 Geo. 6. c. 47))
Consolidated Fund Act 1806 (repealed)	46 Geo. 3. c. 44	5 May 1806
An Act for carrying to the consolidated fund of Great Britain, the duties on wine granted by two acts of the forty-third (Note: Excise (No. 2) Act 1803 (43 Geo. 3. c. 81)) and forty-fourth (Note: Excise Act 1804 (44 Geo. 3. c. 49)) years of his present Majesty. (Repealed by Statute Law Revision Act 1861 (24 & 25 Vict. c. 101))
Treasury of the Ordnance Act 1806 (repealed)	46 Geo. 3. c. 45	5 May 1806
An Act for the better regulation of the office of treasurer of the ordnance. (Repealed by Statute Law Revision Act 1861 (24 & 25 Vict. c. 101))
Treasury Bills (Ireland) (No. 2) Act 1806 (repealed)	46 Geo. 3. c. 46	23 May 1806
An Act for raising the sum of five hundred thousand pounds by treasury-bills, for the service of Ireland, for the year one thousand eight hundred and six. (Repealed by Statute Law Revision Act 1872 (35 & 36 Vict. c. 63))
National Debt (No. 2) Act 1806 (repealed)	46 Geo. 3. c. 47	23 May 1806
An Act for raising a certain sum of money by way annuities or debentures for the service of Ireland. (Repealed by Statute Law Revision Act 1870 (33 & 34 Vict. c. 69))
Mutiny (No. 2) Act 1806 (repealed)	46 Geo. 3. c. 48	23 May 1806
An Act for continuing an act made in this Session of Parliament, (Note: Mutiny Act 1806 (46 Geo. 3. c. 15)) intituled, "An act for punishing mutiny and desertion, and for the better payment of the army and their quarters, within the United Kingdom, and the islands of Jersey, Guernsey, Alderney, Sark, and Man. (Repealed by Statute Law Revision Act 1872 (35 & 36 Vict. c. 63))
Salaries of Judges (Scotland) Act 1806 (repealed)	46 Geo. 3. c. 49	23 May 1806
An Act for increasing the salaries of the judge of the court of admiralty in Scotland, and of the judges of the court in Edinburgh. (Repealed by Statute Law Revision Act 1872 (35 & 36 Vict. c. 63))
Annuity to Lord Saint Vincent Act 1806 (repealed)	46 Geo. 3. c. 50	23 May 1806
An Act for extending the annuity granted to the Earl of St. Vincent, to the two next persons to whom the title of Viscount St. Vincent is limited. (Repealed by Statute Law Revision Act 1953 (2 & 3 Eliz. 2. c. 5))
Defence of the Realm Act 1806 (repealed)	46 Geo. 3. c. 51	23 May 1806
An Act to repeal several acts passed in the forty-third (Note: Defence of the Realm (England) Act 1803 (43 Geo. 3. c. 82)) (Note: Defence of the Realm (Scotland) Act 1803 (43 Geo. 3. c. 83)) and forty-fourth (Note: Defence of the Realm, etc. Act 1804 (44 Geo. 3. c. 56)) (Note: Defence of the Realm, etc. (No. 2) Act 1804 (44 Geo. 3. c. 66)) years respectively of his present Majesty's reign, for the raising and establishing an additional force for the defence of the realm. (Repealed by Statute Law Revision Act 1872 (35 & 36 Vict. c. 63))
Slave Trade Act 1806 (repealed)	46 Geo. 3. c. 52	23 May 1806
An Act to prevent the importation of slaves, by any of his Majesty's subjects, into any islands, colonies, plantations, or territories belonging to any foreign sovereign, state, or power; and also to render more effectual a certain order, made by his Majesty in council on the fifteenth day of August one thousand eight hundred and five, for prohibiting the importation of slaves (except in certain cases), into any of the settlements, islands, colonies, or plantations on the continent of America, or in the West Indies, which have been surrendered to his Majesty's arms during the present war; and to prevent the fitting out of foreign slave-ships from British ports. (Repealed by Statute Law Revision Act 1861 (24 & 25 Vict. c. 101))
Importation, etc. Act 1806 (repealed)	46 Geo. 3. c. 53	23 May 1806
An Act for indemnifying all persons who have been concerned in advising, issuing, or carrying into execution any order or orders for permitting the importation and exportation of certain goods and commodities in foreign bottoms, into and out of his Majesty's West-India islands, and the colonies, settlements, and territories, which have been conquered by his Majesty's arms. (Repealed by Statute Law Revision Act 1872 (35 & 36 Vict. c. 63))
Offences at Sea Act 1806 (repealed)	46 Geo. 3. c. 54	23 May 1806
An Act for the more speedy trial of offences committed in distant parts upon the sea. (Repealed by Criminal Law Act 1967)
National Debt (No. 3) Act 1806 (repealed)	46 Geo. 3. c. 55	9 June 1806
An Act to provide for the Payment, at the Bank of Ireland, of the Interest on certain Debentures now payable at the Exchequer of Ireland; and also for altering the Days of Payment of the Interest or Dividends on certain Annuities in Ireland. (Repealed by Statute Law Revision Act 1870 (33 & 34 Vict. c. 69))
Duties on Spirits (Ireland) Act 1806 (repealed)	46 Geo. 3. c. 56	9 June 1806
An Act to amend an Act of the last Session of Parliament (Note: Duties on Spirituous Liquors (Ireland) Act 1805 (45 Geo. 3. c. 104)) for continuing and amending several Acts for regulating and securing the Collection of the Duties on Spirituous Liquors distilled in Ireland, and the Warehousing of such Spirits for Exportation. (Repealed by Statute Law Revision Act 1872 (35 & 36 Vict. c. 63))
Malt Duties, etc. Act 1806 (repealed)	46 Geo. 3. c. 57	9 June 1806
An Act to amend an Act made in the last Session of Parliament (Note: Collection of Malt Duties, etc. Act 1805 (45 Geo. 3. c. 53)) for the Collection of the Malt Duties in Ireland, and regulating the Trade of a Maltster. (Repealed by Duty on Malt (Ireland) Act 1813 (53 Geo. 3. c. 74)
Customs and Excise (Ireland) Act 1806 (repealed)	46 Geo. 3. c. 58	9 June 1806
An Act for establishing certain Regulations in the Collection and Management of His Majesty's Revenues of Customs, Excise and Taxes in Ireland. (Repealed by Statute Law Revision Act 1872 (35 & 36 Vict. c. 63))
Packing of Butter (Ireland) Act 1806 (repealed)	46 Geo. 3. c. 59	9 June 1806
An Act to regulate the Packing of Butter in Ireland for Sale or Exportation. (Repealed by Butter Trade (Ireland) Act 1812 (52 Geo. 3. c. 134)
Small Livings (Ireland) Act 1806	46 Geo. 3. c. 60	9 June 1806
An Act for amending an act passed in Ireland, in the twenty-ninth year of King George the Second, (Note: First-Fruits and Boulter's Bequest Act 1755 (29 Geo. 2. c. 18 (I))) intituled "An act for amending and making more effectual the several laws relating to the first-fruits payable out of ecclesiastical benefices in this kingdom; and for the better regulation and management of the charitable bequest of Doctor Hugh Boulter, late lord archbishop of Armagh, for augmenting the maintenance of poor clergy in this kingdom, so far only as relates to the said charitable bequest.
Postage Act 1806	46 Geo. 3. c. 61	9 June 1806
An Act to authorize certain Public Officers to send and receive Letters and Packets by the Post, free from the Duty of Postage.
Duties and Drawbacks (Ireland) (No. 2) Act 1806 (repealed)	46 Geo. 3. c. 62	13 June 1806
An Act for granting to His Majesty, until the Twenty ninth Day of September One thousand eight hundred and six, certain Duties on the Importation, and to allow certain Drawbacks and Bounties on the Exportation of certain Sorts of Iron, Sugar and Tea into and from Ireland. (Repealed by Statute Law Revision Act 1872 (35 & 36 Vict. c. 63))
Defence of the Realm (Ireland) Act 1806 (repealed)	46 Geo. 3. c. 63	13 June 1806
An Act to repeal several Acts passed in the Forty third (Note: Defence of the Realm (Ireland) Act 1803 (43 Geo. 3. c. 85)) and Forty fourth (Note: Defence of the Realm, etc. (Ireland) Act 1804 (44 Geo. 3. c. 74)) Years of His present Majesty, for raising and establishing an additional Force in Ireland for the Defence of the Realm. (Repealed by Statute Law Revision Act 1872 (35 & 36 Vict. c. 63))
Stamps (Ireland) Act 1806 (repealed)	46 Geo. 3. c. 64	13 June 1806
An Act to repeal the several Duties under the Care of the Commissioners for managing the Duties upon Stamped Vellum, Parchment and Paper in Ireland, and to grant new and additional Duties in lieu thereof; and to amend the Laws relating to the Stamp Duties in Ireland. (Repealed by Statute Law Revision Act 1861 (24 & 25 Vict. c. 101))
Income Tax Act 1806 (repealed)	46 Geo. 3. c. 65	13 June 1806
An Act for granting to His Majesty, during the present War and until the Sixth Day of April next after the Ratification of a Definitive Treaty of Peace, further additional Rates and Duties in Great Britain on the Rates and Duties on Profits arising from Property, Professions, Trades and Offices; and for repealing an Act passed in the Forty fifth Year of His present Majesty, for repealing certain Parts of an Act made in the Forty third Year of His present Majesty, for granting a Contribution on the Profits arising from Property, Professions, Trades and Offices; and to consolidate and render more effectual the Provisions for collecting the said Duties. (Repealed by Statute Law Revision Act 1872 (35 & 36 Vict. c. 63))
Mutiny (No. 3) Act 1806 (repealed)	46 Geo. 3. c. 66	20 June 1806
An Act for punishing Mutiny and Desertion; and for the better Payment of the Army and their Quarters. (Repealed by Statute Law Revision Act 1872 (35 & 36 Vict. c. 63))
Malt and Spirit Duties (Ireland) Act 1806 (repealed)	46 Geo. 3. c. 67	20 June 1806
An Act for granting to His Majesty certain Duties upon Malt and Spirits made in Ireland. (Repealed by Statute Law Revision Act 1872 (35 & 36 Vict. c. 63))
Dublin Paying, etc., Inquiry Act 1806	46 Geo. 3. c. 68	20 June 1806
An Act to continue until the Twenty fourth Day of June One thousand eight hundred and seven, and amend an Act made in the last Session of Parliament, (Note: Paving of Streets, etc., Dublin Act 1805 (45 Geo. 3. c. 112)) for appointing Commissioners to enquire and examine into any Irregularities and Abuses which might have taken place in conducting and managing the paving, cleansing and lighting the Streets of Dublin.
Pensions to Soldiers Act 1806 (repealed)	46 Geo. 3. c. 69	20 June 1806
An Act for making better Provision for Soldiers. (Repealed by Chelsea and Kilmainham Hospitals Act 1826 (7 Geo. 4]. c. 16))
Spirit, etc., Licences (Ireland) Act 1806	46 Geo. 3. c. 70	3 July 1806
An Act to amend an Act, made in the last Session of Parliament, (Note: Sale of Spirituous Liquors (45 Geo. 3. c. 50)) for regulating Licences for the Sale of Spirituous Liquors, Wine, Beer, Ale, and Cyder, by Retail, in Ireland.
Mines (Ireland) Act 1806	46 Geo. 3. c. 71	3 July 1806
An Act to amend several Acts for the Encouragement of finding and working Mines and Minerals within Ireland.
Tortola Trade Act 1806	46 Geo. 3. c. 72	3 July 1806
An Act for enabling His Majesty to permit the Importation and Exportation of certain Goods and Commodities into, and from, the Port of Road Harbour, in the Island of Tortola.
Postage (No. 2) Act 1806	46 Geo. 3. c. 73	3 July 1806
An Act for granting Rates of Postage on the Conveyance of Letters and Packets to and from Gibraltar and the Island of Malta.
Importation Act 1806 (repealed)	46 Geo. 3. c. 74	3 July 1806
An Act for permitting Prussian Yarn to be imported in Foreign Ships, on Payment of the like Duties as if imported in British Ships. (Repealed by Customs Law Repeal Act 1825 (6 Geo. 4. c. 105))
Excise (No. 2) Act 1806 (repealed)	46 Geo. 3. c. 75	3 July 1806
An Act for the better Regulation of the Office of Receiver General of the Duties of Excise in England. (Repealed by Statute Law Revision Act 1861 (24 & 25 Vict. c. 101))
Receiver General of Stamps Act 1806 (repealed)	46 Geo. 3. c. 76	3 July 1806
An Act for the better Regulation of the Office of Receiver General of the Stamp Duties in England. (Repealed by Statute Law Revision Act 1872 (35 & 36 Vict. c. 63))
Discovery of Longitude at Sea, etc. Act 1806 (repealed)	46 Geo. 3. c. 77	3 July 1806
An Act for continuing the encouragement of persons making discoveries for finding the longitude at sea, or other useful discoveries and improvements in navigation, and for making experiments relating thereto; and for discharging certain debts incurred by the commissioners of the longitude in carrying the relating thereto into execution. (Repealed by Statute Law Revision Act 1872 (35 & 36 Vict. c. 63))
Assessed Taxes Act 1806 (repealed)	46 Geo. 3. c. 78	3 July 1806
An Act for granting to His Majesty an additional Duty on the Amount of the Duties under the Management of the Commissioners for the Affairs of Taxes therein mentioned. (Repealed by Statute Law Revision Act 1861 (24 & 25 Vict. c. 101))
Duke of Grafton's Annuity Act 1806	46 Geo. 3. c. 79	3 July 1806
An Act to confirm an Agreement entered into between the Commissioners of His Majesty's Treasury, and the Most Noble Augustus Henry Duke of Grafton, in pursuance of an Act of the Forty third Year of His present Majesty. (Note: Prisage and Butlerage of Wines Act 1803 (43 Geo. 3. c. 156))
West Indies Act 1806 (repealed)	46 Geo. 3. c. 80	3 July 1806
An Act to provide for the more effectual examination of accounts of the expenditure of the publick money in the West Indies, and for the better discovery of frauds and abuses therein. (Repealed by Statute Law Revision Act 1872 (35 & 36 Vict. c. 63))
Thread Lace Manufacture (England) Act 1806 (repealed)	46 Geo. 3. c. 81	12 July 1806
An Act for better encouraging the Manufacture of Thread Lace in Great Britain. (Repealed by Statute Law Revision Act 1872 (35 & 36 Vict. c. 63))
Fees, Port of London, etc. Act 1806	46 Geo. 3. c. 82	12 July 1806
An Act for abolishing Fees received by certain Officers and other Persons employed in the Service of the Customs, in the Port of London; and for regulating the Attendance of Officers and others so employed.
Post Office Act 1806 (repealed)	46 Geo. 3. c. 83	12 July 1806
An Act for the better Regulation of the Office of Receiver General of the Post Office in England. (Repealed by Customs Law Repeal Act 1825 (6 Geo. 4. c. 105))
Taxation Act 1806	46 Geo. 3. c. 84	12 July 1806
An Act to grant certain Allowances out of the Duties, under the Management of the Commissioners for the Affairs of Taxes, to Persons in respect of the Number of their Children.
East India Company Act 1806 (repealed)	46 Geo. 3. c. 85	12 July 1806
An Act for reviving and continuing until the twenty-fifth day of March one thousand eight hundred and thirteen, an act made in the forty-third year of his present Majesty (Note: East India Company (No. 2) Act 1803 (43 Geo. 3. c. 63)) for regulating the manner in which the United Company of Merchants of England trading to the East Indies shall hire and take up ships for their regular service. (Repealed by Statute Law Revision Act 1872 (35 & 36 Vict. c. 63))
Norwich Castle and Gaol Act 1806	46 Geo. 3. c. 86	12 July 1806
An Act for enabling his Majesty to grant the castle of Norwich, with the common gaol, castle-hill, and certain land adjacent thereto in the county of Norfolk, and for vesting the same in his Majesty's justices of the peace for the said county, for the use thereof and for other purposes relating thereto.
Customs (Ireland) Act 1806 (repealed)	46 Geo. 3. c. 87	12 July 1806
An Act more effectually to regulate the Collection of the Duties on Goods, Wares and Merchandize imported or exported into or from Ireland; and the Payment of Bounties, Allowances and Drawbacks thereon. (Repealed by Statute Law Revision Act 1861 (24 & 25 Vict. c. 101))
Duties on Spirits (Ireland) (No. 2) Act 1806	46 Geo. 3. c. 88	12 July 1806
An Act to provide for the regulating and securing the Collection of the Duties on Spirits distilled in Ireland, and the Warehousing of such Spirits for Exportation.
Houses of Parliament Act 1806	46 Geo. 3. c. 89	16 July 1806
An Act for consolidating and rendering more effectual the several acts for the purchase of buildings and further improvement of the streets and places near to Westminster-Hall, and the two houses of parliament.
Defence of the Realm (No. 2) Act 1806 (repealed)	46 Geo. 3. c. 90	16 July 1806
An Act to enable his Majesty annually to train and exercise a proportion of his subjects in England, under certain regulations, and more effectually to provide for the defence of the realm. (Repealed by Militia (Voluntary Enlistment) Act 1875 (38 & 39 Vict. c. 69))
Militia Act 1806 (repealed)	46 Geo. 3. c. 91	16 July 1806
An Act for the Return of correct Lists of Persons liable to serve in the Militia, under an Act passed in the Forty second Year of His present Majesty; (Note: Militia Act 1802 (42 Geo. 3. c. 90)) and to suspend the Ballot for the Militia in England for Two Years. (Repealed by Statute Law Revision Act 1872 (35 & 36 Vict. c. 63))
Postage (No. 3) Act 1806	46 Geo. 3. c. 92	16 July 1806
An Act to amend Three Acts made in the Thirty fifth, (Note: Postage Act 1795 (35 Geo. 3. c. 53)) Forty first, (Note: Postage Act 1801 (41 Geo. 3. (U.K.) c. 7)) and Forty second (Note: Post Office Act 1802 (42 Geo. 3. c. 81)) Years of His present Majesty, relating to the Conveyance of Letters and Packets by the Post.
Exchequer Bills Act 1806 (repealed)	46 Geo. 3. c. 93	16 July 1806
An Act to enable the Lords Commissioners of His Majesty's Treasury to issue Exchequer Bills, on the Credit of such Aids or Supplies as have been or shall be granted by Parliament for the Service of Great Britain for the Year One thousand eight hundred and six. (Repealed by Statute Law Revision Act 1872 (35 & 36 Vict. c. 63))
Duties of Prisage and Butlerage (Ireland) Act 1806 (repealed)	46 Geo. 3. c. 94	16 July 1806
An Act to enable the Commissioners for executing the Office of Lord High Treasurer of Ireland, to contract for the Purchase of the Duties of Prisage and Butlerage in Ireland. (Repealed by Statute Law Revision Act 1872 (35 & 36 Vict. c. 63))
Hospitals and Infirmaries (Ireland) Act 1806 (repealed)	46 Geo. 3. c. 95	16 July 1806
An Act for the more effectually regulating and providing for the Relief of the Poor, and the Management of Infirmaries and Hospitals in Ireland. (Repealed by Statute Law Revision Act 1872 (35 & 36 Vict. c. 63))
Highways (Ireland) Act 1806 (repealed)	46 Geo. 3. c. 96	16 July 1806
An Act to amend the Laws respecting the accounting for Money presented in Ireland for the making, repairing, widening or fencing of Public Roads, and the building and repairing of Bridges, Pipes or Gullets. (Repealed by Statute Law Revision Act 1872 (35 & 36 Vict. c. 63))
Grain Between Great Britain and Ireland Act 1806 (repealed)	46 Geo. 3. c. 97	16 July 1806
An Act to permit the free Interchange of every Species of Grain between Great Britain and Ireland. (Repealed by Statute Law Revision Act 1861 (24 & 25 Vict. c. 101))
Quarantine (Great Britain) Act 1806 (repealed)	46 Geo. 3. c. 98	16 July 1806
An Act for making additional and further Provisions for the effectual Performance of Quarantine in Great Britain. (Repealed by Statute Law Revision Act 1872 (35 & 36 Vict. c. 63))
Bounty on Exportation Act 1806	46 Geo. 3. c. 99	16 July 1806
An Act for allowing a Bounty on the Exportation of Oil of Vitriol made in Great Britain.
Greenwich Hospital Act 1806	46 Geo. 3. c. 100	16 July 1806
An Act to empower the commissioners and governors of the royal hospital for seamen at Greenwich, in the county of Kent, to make certain allowances to old, infirm, or wounded or disabled officers in the royal navy, and to provide a fund for the payment of such allowances, and for the increase of pensions to disabled seamen and marines.
Chest of Greenwich Act 1806	46 Geo. 3. c. 101	16 July 1806
An Act for improving the funds of the chest at Greenwich, and amending an act passed in the forty-third year his present Majesty, (Note: Chest at Chatham Act 1803 (43 Geo. 3. c. 119)) relating to the said chest.
Duties on Stills, etc. (Scotland) Act 1806 (repealed)	46 Geo. 3. c. 102	16 July 1806
An Act for repealing the Duties of Excise on Stills used for distilling or rectifying Low Wines or Spirits for Consumption in Scotland; on Worts or Wash made for extracting Spirits; and on Spirits made for Consumption in Scotland; and for granting and securing other Duties in lieu thereof; and for better securing the Duties on Foreign Spirits and on Malt. (Repealed by Statute Law Revision Act 1861 (24 & 25 Vict. c. 101))
Importation (No. 2) Act 1806 (repealed)	46 Geo. 3. c. 103	16 July 1806
An Act for allowing, until the First Day of August One thousand eight hundred and seven, the Importation of certain Fish from Newfoundland, and the Coast of Labrador, and for granting a Bounty thereon. (Repealed by Statute Law Revision Act 1872 (35 & 36 Vict. c. 63))
Bringing Coals to London, etc. Act 1806 (repealed)	46 Geo. 3. c. 104	16 July 1806
An Act for continuing until the First Day of August One thousand eight hundred and seven, an Act of the last Session of Parliament, (Note: Bringing of Coals, etc., to London, etc. Act 1805 (45 Geo. 3. c. 128)) for allowing, under certain Restrictions, the bringing a limited Quantity of Coals, Culm or Cinders to London and Westminster, by Inland Navigation. (Repealed by Customs Law Repeal Act 1825 (6 Geo. 4. c. 105))
Fortifications (Portsmouth and Dover) Act 1806	46 Geo. 3. c. 105	16 July 1806
An Act to vest certain messuages, lands, tenements, and hereditaments, in trustees, for better securing his Majesty's docks, ships, and stores, at Portsmouth; and for extending the lines and works at Dover.
Revenue (Ireland) Act 1806	46 Geo. 3. c. 106	16 July 1806
An Act to provided for the better Execution of the several Acts relating to the Revenues, Matters, and Things under the Management of the Commissioners of Customs and Port Duties, and of the Commissioners of Inland Excise and Taxes in Ireland.
Land Tax, etc. Act 1806 (repealed)	46 Geo. 3. c. 107	16 July 1806
An Act for rectifying Mistakes in the Names of the Commissioners appointed by an Act made in the last Session of Parliament, (Note: Land Tax Act 1805 (45 Geo. 3. c. 48)) intituled "An Act for appointing Commissioners for putting into Execution an Act of this Session of Parliament, (Note: Duties on Pensions, etc. Act 1805 (45 Geo. 3. c. 2)) for continuing and granting to His Majesty a Duty on Pensions, Offices and Personal Estates in England, and certain Duties on Sugar, Malt, Tobacco and Snuff, in Great Britain, for the Service of the Year One thousand eight hundred and five; and an Act made in the Thirty eighth Year of His present Majesty, (Note: Land Tax Act 1797 (38 Geo. 3. c. 5)) for granting an Aid to His Majesty by a Land Tax, to be raised in Great Britain for the Service of the Year One thousand seven hundred and ninety eight;" and for appointing other Commissioners, together with those named in the first mentioned Act, to put in Execution an Act of this Session of Parliament, (Note: Duties on Pensions, etc. Act 1806 (46 Geo. 3. c. 3)) for continuing and granting to His Majesty a Duty on Pensions, Offices and Personal Estates in England, and certain Duties on Sugar, Malt, Tobacco and Snuff in Great Britain, for the Service of the Year One thousand eight hundred and six, also the said Act made in the Thirty eighth Year of His present Majesty; and for indemnifying such Persons as have acted as Commissioners for executing the said Acts. (Repealed by Statute Law Revision Act 1872 (35 & 36 Vict. c. 63))
Insolvent Debtors Relief Act 1806 (repealed)	46 Geo. 3. c. 108	21 July 1806
An Act for the Relief of certain Insolvent Debtors. (Repealed by Statute Law Revision Act 1872 (35 & 36 Vict. c. 63))
Bounty on Sugar, etc. Act 1806 (repealed)	46 Geo. 3. c. 109	21 July 1806
An Act for reducing the Bounty payable on the Exportation of refined Sugar from Great Britain, and for allowing the like Bounty on the Exportation of Sugar Candy, as is payable on refined Sugar. (Repealed by Statute Law Revision Act 1861 (24 & 25 Vict. c. 101))
Bounty on Silk Manufactures Act 1806 (repealed)	46 Geo. 3. c. 110	21 July 1806
An Act for granting during the continuance of the present war, and until six months after the ratification of a definitive treaty of peace, an additional bounty on the exportation of the silk manufactures of Great Britain. (Repealed by Statute Law Revision Act 1861 (24 & 25 Vict. c. 101))
Neutral Ships Act 1806 (repealed)	46 Geo. 3. c. 111	21 July 1806
An Act for authorizing His Majesty in Council to allow, during the present War, and for Six Months after the Ratification of a Definitive Treaty of Peace, the Importation and Exportation of certain Goods and Commodities in Neutral Ships, into and from His Majesty's Territories in the West Indies and Continent of South America. (Repealed by Statute Law Revision Act 1872 (35 & 36 Vict. c. 63))
Excise (No. 3) Act 1806 (repealed)	46 Geo. 3. c. 112	21 July 1806
An Act to amend the Laws of Excise, so far as relates to Prosecutions for Penalties, to the counterfeiting the Stamps on the Wrappers of Paper, and to the punishing Persons guilty of Perjury. (Repealed by Statute Law Revision Act 1872 (35 & 36 Vict. c. 63))
Importation (No. 3) Act 1806 (repealed)	46 Geo. 3. c. 113	21 July 1806
An Act to permit for and during the Continuance of the present War, French Wines to be imported from Ireland into Great Britain in Bottles or Flasks, under certain Restrictions. (Repealed by Statute Law Revision Act 1872 (35 & 36 Vict. c. 63))
Drawback Act 1806 (repealed)	46 Geo. 3. c. 114	21 July 1806
An Act to amend an Act passed in the last Session of Parliament, (Note: Drawback on Linens Act 1805 (45 Geo. 3. c. 98)) for increasing the Drawback on Linens exported Great Britain to the West Indies. (Repealed by Statute Law Revision Act 1861 (24 & 25 Vict. c. 101))
Exportation (No. 3) Act 1806 (repealed)	46 Geo. 3. c. 115	21 July 1806
An Act to permit Raisins, Currants and Figs to be exported from Great Britain, Duty free. (Repealed by Statute Law Revision Act 1861 (24 & 25 Vict. c. 101))
Exportation (No. 4) Act 1806 (repealed)	46 Geo. 3. c. 116	21 July 1806
An Act to allow certain Articles to be exported from Gibraltar and Malta direct to His Majesty's Colonies in North America, in return for British American Fish. (Repealed by Customs Law Repeal Act 1825 (6 Geo. 4. c. 105))
Importation (No. 4) Act 1806 (repealed)	46 Geo. 3. c. 117	21 July 1806
An Act to permit until the First Day of January One thousand eight hundred and nine, the Importation of Masts, Yards and Bowsprits, or of Timber fit for Naval Purposes, from the British Colonies in North America, Duty free. (Repealed by Statute Law Revision Act 1872 (35 & 36 Vict. c. 63))
Purchase of Quays in Port of London Act 1806	46 Geo. 3. c. 118	21 July 1806
An Act to extend the Time for purchasing the Legal Quays and Warehouses in the Port of London, and for authorising the Lords Commissioners of His Majesty's Treasury to purchase Somers and Lyons Quays in the said Port.
Slave Trade (No. 2) Act 1806 (repealed)	46 Geo. 3. c. 119	21 July 1806
An Act to prohibit for Two Years after the Conclusion of the present Session of Parliament, any Ships to clear out from any Port of Great Britain, for the Coast of Africa, for the Purpose of taking on board Negroes, unless such Ships shall have been previously employed in the African Trade, or contracted for that Purpose. (Repealed by Statute Law Revision Act 1872 (35 & 36 Vict. c. 63))
Duties, Bounties, etc. (Ireland) Act 1806 (repealed)	46 Geo. 3. c. 120	21 July 1806
An Act to continue several acts for granting certain rates and duties, and allowing certain drawbacks and bounties on goods, wares, and merchandize imported into and exported from Ireland, until the fifth day of July one thousand eight hundred and seven; and several acts for granting duties upon malt and spirits made and distilled in Ireland, and for the better collection and security of the revenues of customs and excise in Ireland, and for preventing frauds therein, until the twenty-ninth day of September one thousand eight hundred and seven; and to amend several of the said acts. (Repealed by Statute Law Revision Act 1872 (35 & 36 Vict. c. 63))
Importation (No. 5) Act 1806 (repealed)	46 Geo. 3. c. 121	21 July 1806
An Act to repeal so much of an Act, made in the First Year of King James the Second, (Note: Importing, etc., of Gunpowder, etc. Act 1685 (1 Ja. 2. c. 8)) as prohibits the Importation of Gunpowder, Arms and Utensils of War, from Ireland. (Repealed by Statute Law Revision Act 1872 (35 & 36 Vict. c. 63))
Education (Ireland) Act 1806 (repealed)	46 Geo. 3. c. 122	21 July 1806
An Act to revive and amend an Act made in the Parliament of Ireland, (Note: Endowed Schools Commission Act 1788 (28 Geo. 3. c. 15 (I))) for enabling the Lord Lieutenant to appoint Commissioners for enquiring into the several Funds and Revenues granted for the Purposes of Education, and into the State and Conditions of all Schools in Ireland. (Repealed by Statute Law Revision Act 1872 (35 & 36 Vict. c. 63))
Sale of Crown Rents (Ireland) Act 1806	46 Geo. 3. c. 123	21 July 1806
An Act to amend several Acts for the Sale of His Majesty's Quit Rents, Crown and other Rents, and of certain Lands forfeited and undisposed of in Ireland.
Irish Militia Act 1806 (repealed)	46 Geo. 3. c. 124	21 July 1806
An Act to enable His Majesty to accept the Services of Volunteers from the Militia of Ireland, under certain Restrictions. (Repealed by Statute Law Revision Act 1861 (24 & 25 Vict. c. 101))
Yeomanry, etc. Act 1806 (repealed)	46 Geo. 3. c. 125	21 July 1806
An Act for regulating the Rank of Officers in Yeomanry and Volunteer Corps. (Repealed by Statute Law Revision Act 1872 (35 & 36 Vict. c. 63))
Quartering of Soldiers Act 1806 (repealed)	46 Geo. 3. c. 126	21 July 1806
An Act for increasing the Rates of Subsistence to be paid to Innkeepers and others on quartering Soldiers. (Repealed by Statute Law Revision Act 1872 (35 & 36 Vict. c. 63))
Navy Act 1806 (repealed)	46 Geo. 3. c. 127	21 July 1806
An Act to amend and extend the Benefits of an Act made in the Thirty fifth Year of His present Majesty, (Note: Navy and Marines Act 1795 (35 Geo. 3. c. 28)) to enable Petty Officers, Seamen and Marines, serving in His Majesty's Navy, to allot Part of their Wages or Pay for the Maintenance of their Wives and Families. (Repealed by Pay of the Navy Act 1830 (11 Geo. 4 & 1 Will. 4. c. 20))
Masters in Chancery Act 1806 (repealed)	46 Geo. 3. c. 128	21 July 1806
An Act for making Provision for such Masters in Ordinary of the High Court of Chancery as from Age or Infirmity shall be desirous of resigning their Offices with the Approbation of the said Court; and for augmenting the Income of the Masters in Ordinary of the said Court. (Repealed by Statute Law Revision Act 1861 (24 & 25 Vict. c. 101))
Court of Chancery Act 1806	46 Geo. 3. c. 129	21 July 1806
An Act to provide additional Salaries to the present Clerks in the Office of the Accountant General of the High Court of Chancery, and to provide additional Clerks for the said Office, with Salaries; and to make other Payments in respect of the said Office.
Docks, etc., at Chatham, etc. Act 1806	46 Geo. 3. c. 130	21 July 1806
An act for making compensation to the proprietors of such lands and hereditaments as have been purchased for better securing his Majesty's docks, ships, and stores at Chatham, and for the use of his Majesty's ordnance at Warley Common and Woolwich, in pursuance of an act made in the forty-fourth year of his present Majesty. (Note: Docks and Ordnance Service Act 1804 (44 Geo. 3. c. 79))
Lewis (Estates and Crown Claims) Act 1806 (repealed)	46 Geo. 3. c. 131	21 June 1806
An Act for exonerating the Estates of Percival Lewis Esquire, and Marianne Lewis Spinster, in the Parish of Putney in the County of Surrey, from the Claims of His Majesty against the Estate of Edward Lewis Esquire, deceased. (Repealed by Statute Law Revision Act 1950 (14 Geo. 6. c. 6))
Cape Rock Lighthouse (Scotland) Act 1806 (repealed)	46 Geo. 3. c. 132	21 June 1806
An Act for erecting a light-house on the Bell or Cape-Rock, on the Eastern coast of Scotland; and for enabling the commissioners of the Treasury to advance a certain sum of money out of the consolidated fund of Great Britain, towards that purpose. (Repealed by Merchant Shipping Repeal Act 1854 (17 & 18 Vict. c. 120))
Land Tax Redemption Act 1806 (repealed)	46 Geo. 3. c. 133	22 July 1806
An Act to amend an act passed in the forty-second year of his present Majesty, (Note: Land Tax Redemption Act 1802 (42 Geo. 3. c. 116)) for consolidating the several acts passed for the redemption and sale of the land-tax, and to make further provision for exonerating small livings and charitable institutions from the land-tax. (Repealed by Statute Law Revision Act 1872 (35 & 36 Vict. c. 63))
Highways (Ireland) (No. 2) Act 1806 (repealed)	46 Geo. 3. c. 134	22 July 1806
An Act to provide for the security and expedition of the conveyance of letters by the post in Ireland. (Repealed by Statute Law Revision Act 1872 (35 & 36 Vict. c. 63))
Bankrupts Act 1806 (repealed)	46 Geo. 3. c. 135	22 July 1806
An Act to amend the Laws relating to Bankrupts. (Repealed by Bankruptcy Act 1825 (6 Geo. 4. c. 16)
Stage Coaches, etc. Act 1806 (repealed)	46 Geo. 3. c. 136	22 July 1806
An Act to alter and amend Two Acts, made in the Twenty-eighth (Note: Stage Coaches Act 1788 (28 Geo. 3. c. 57)) and Thirtieth (Note: Stage Coaches Act 1790 (30 Geo. 3. c. 36)) Years of His present Majesty, for limiting the Number of Persons to be carried on the Outside of Stage Coaches or other Carriages, and regulating the Conduct of the Drivers and Guards thereof. (Repealed by Stage Coaches, etc. (Great Britain) Act 1810 (50 Geo. 3. c. 48))
Bonding Warehouses Act 1806 (repealed)	46 Geo. 3. c. 137	22 July 1806
An Act to extend the Provisions of an Act made in the Forty third Year of His present Majesty, (Note: Warehousing of Goods Act 1803 (43 Geo. 3. c. 132)) for permitting certain Articles to be warehoused in Great Britain, to other Articles not therein mentioned, and to alter the Condition of the Bond directed to be given by an Act of the Twenty fourth Year of His present Majesty, (Note: Smuggling Act 1784 (24 Geo. 3. Sess. 2. c. 47)) by the Masters and Owners of Vessels and Boats licensed by the Lords of the Admiralty. (Repealed by Customs Law Repeal Act 1825 (6 Geo. 4. c. 105))
Excise (No. 4) Act 1806 (repealed)	46 Geo. 3. c. 138	22 July 1806
An Act to repeal Part of the Excise Countervailing Duty on Irish Hops imported; for granting an Excise Countervailing Duty on the Importation of Irish Window Glass; and to exempt Tiles, made for the Purpose of draining Lands, from the Duties of Excise. (Repealed by Statute Law Revision Act 1872 (35 & 36 Vict. c. 63))
Malt Duties (No. 2) Act 1806 (repealed)	46 Geo. 3. c. 139	22 July 1806
An Act for altering and amending several Laws relating to the Duties of Excise upon Malt, until the Twenty fifth Day of March One thousand eight hundred and seven. (Repealed by Statute Law Revision Act 1872 (35 & 36 Vict. c. 63))
Militia (No. 2) Act 1806 (repealed)	46 Geo. 3. c. 140	22 July 1806
An Act to amend two acts, passed in the forty-second year of his present Majesty, (Note: Militia Act 1802 (42 Geo. 3. c. 90)) (Note: Militia (Scotland) Act 1802 (42 Geo. 3. c. 91)) relating to the militia of England and Scotland respectively as to the pay of the officers and men of the said militia. (Repealed by Militia (Voluntary Enlistment) Act 1875 (38 & 39 Vict. c. 69))
Audit of Public Accounts Act 1806	46 Geo. 3. c. 141	22 July 1806
An Act for making more effectual provision for the more speedy and regular examination and audit of the publick accounts of this kingdom.
Woods and Forests Act 1806 (repealed)	46 Geo. 3. c. 142	22 July 1806
An Act for the better regulation of the office of surveyor-general of woods and forests. (Repealed by Statute Law Revision Act 1861 (24 & 25 Vict. c. 101))
Windsor Forest Act 1806	46 Geo. 3. c. 143	22 July 1806
An Act for enquiring into the state of Windsor Forest in the county of Berks, and for ascertaining the boundaries of the said forest, and of the lands of the crown within the same.
Defence of the Realm, London Act 1806 (repealed)	46 Geo. 3. c. 144	22 July 1806
An Act to repeal an act passed in the forty-fourth year of his present Majesty, (Note: Defence of the Realm, London Act 1804 (44 Geo. 3. c. 96)) intituled, "An act to alter, amend, and render more effectual an act, passed in the present session of parliament, (Note: Defence of the Realm, etc. Act 1804 (44 Geo. 3. c. 56)) intituled, 'An act for establishing and maintaining a permanent additional force for the defence of the realm, and to provide for augmenting his Majesty's regular forces, and for the gradual reduction of the militia of England,' so far as the same relates to the city of London." (Repealed by Statute Law Revision Act 1872 (35 & 36 Vict. c. 63))
Annuities to Royal Family Act 1806 (repealed)	46 Geo. 3. c. 145	22 July 1806
An Act for enabling his Majesty to settle annuities on certain branches of the Royal Family. (Repealed by Statute Law Revision Act 1872 (35 & 36 Vict. c. 63))
Lord Nelson (Annuity) Act 1806	46 Geo. 3. c. 146	22 July 1806
An Act for settling and securing a certain annuity on the Earl Nelson and the heirs male of his body, and such other persons to whom the title of Earl Nelson may descend; and for granting a sum of money to purchase an estate to accompany the said title; and also for granting a sum of money for the use of the sisters of the late vice-admiral Viscount Nelson; in consideration of the eminent and signal services performed by the said late Viscount Nelson to his Majesty and the publick.
Annuity to Lord Rodney Act 1806 (repealed)	46 Geo. 3. c. 147	22 July 1806
An Act to enable his Majesty to continue a certain annuity to George now Lord Rodney, grandson of George Brydges Lord Rodney, in consideration of the eminent services rendered to his Majesty and the publick by the said George Brydges Lord Rodney. (Repealed by Statute Law Revision Act 1872 (35 & 36 Vict. c. 63))
Lotteries Act 1806	46 Geo. 3. c. 148	22 July 1806
An Act for granting to his Majesty a sum of money to be raised by lotteries.
Appropriation Act 1806 (repealed)	46 Geo. 3. c. 149	22 July 1806
An Act for granting to his Majesty a certain sum of money out of the consolidated fund of Great Britain for the year one thousand eight hundred and six; and for further appropriating the supplies granted in this session of parliament. (Repealed by Statute Law Revision Act 1872 (35 & 36 Vict. c. 63))
Customs Act 1806 (repealed)	46 Geo. 3. c. 150	23 July 1806
An Act for the better regulation of the office of receiver-general of the duties of customs in Great Britain. (Repealed by Customs Law Repeal Act 1825 (6 Geo. 4. c. 105))
Crown Lands Act 1806 (repealed)	46 Geo. 3. c. 151	23 July 1806
An Act to enable his Majesty to grant new leases on former rents for the benefit of charitable institutions, or augmentation of ecclesiastical corporations. (Repealed by Statute Law Revision Act 1861 (24 & 25 Vict. c. 101))
Actions, etc., for Buying Oak Bark, etc. Act 1806 (repealed)	46 Geo. 3. c. 152	23 July 1806
An Act to stay until forty days after the commencement of the next session of parliament, proceedings in actions, prosecutions, or informations under an act made in the second year of King James the First, intituled, "An Act concerning tanners, curriers, shoemakers, and other artificers, occupying the cutting of leather," (Note: Leather Act 1603 (1 Jas. 1. c. 22)) so far as relates to the buying of oak-bark and rough hides and calves' skins in the hair. (Repealed by Statute Law Revision Act 1872 (35 & 36 Vict. c. 63))
Public Harbours Act 1806	46 Geo. 3. c. 153	23 July 1806
An Act for the preservation of the publick harbours of the United Kingdom.
Court of Exchequer (Scotland) Act 1806 (repealed)	46 Geo. 3. c. 154	23 July 1806
An Act for taking down the present building in which the treasury-chambers and offices of the court of Exchequer in Scotland were situated, and erecting new buildings in lieu thereof. (Repealed by Statute Law Revision Act 1872 (35 & 36 Vict. c. 63))
Canals, etc. (Scotland) Act 1806 (repealed)	46 Geo. 3. c. 155	23 July 1806
An Act for applying certain balances arising from the forfeited estates in Scotland, towards making canals, harbours, and other publick works there. (Repealed by Statute Law Revision Act 1872 (35 & 36 Vict. c. 63))
British Fisheries (No. 2) Act 1806 (repealed)	46 Geo. 3. c. 156	23 July 1806
An Act for appropriating certain balances arising from the forfeited estates in Scotland to the use of the British fisheries and the erecting a lunatic asylum at Edinburgh, and the payment of the officers of the late board of annexed estates in Scotland. (Repealed by Statute Law Revision Act 1872 (35 & 36 Vict. c. 63))
Estates of Granada and Saint Vincent Traders Act 1806 (repealed)	46 Geo. 3. c. 157	23 July 1806
An Act for more effectually carrying into Execution the Purposes of an Act made in the Thirty-ninth and Fortieth Year of His present Majesty, (Note: Loans to Grenada and Saint Vincent Traders Act 1799 (39 & 40 Geo. 3. c. 13)) to give further Time For the Payment, on the Conditions therein mentioned, of Installments on certain Loans advanced to the House of Alexander Houstoun and Company, to Charles Ashwell Esquire, and to William Johnstone Esquire, being Persons connected with and trading to the Islands of Grenada and Saint Vincent, so far as relates to the Real and Personal Estates of William Mac Dowall, James Mac Dowell, and Robert Houstoun Rae, in the West Indies and elsewhere, except in Scotland. (Repealed by Statute Law Revision Act 1950 (14 Geo. 6. c. 6))
Estates of Granada and Saint Vincent Traders (Scotland) Act 1806 (repealed)	46 Geo. 3. c. 158	23 July 1806
An Act for more effectually carrying into Execution the Purposes of an Act made in the Thirty-ninth and Fortieth Year of His present Majesty, to give further Time For the Payment, on the Conditions therein mentioned, of Installments on certain Loans advanced to the House of Alexander Houstoun and Company, to Charles Ashwell Esquire, and to William Johnstone Esquire, being Persons connected with and trading to the Islands of Grenada and Saint Vincent, so far as relates to the Real and Personal Estates of William Mac Dowall, James Mac Dowell, and Robert Houstoun Rae, Esquires, in Scotland. (Repealed by Statute Law Revision Act 1950 (14 Geo. 6. c. 6))

=== Local acts ===
Short title	Citation	Royal assent
Long title
Islington Lighting and Watching Act 1806 (repealed)	46 Geo. 3. c. i	22 March 1806
An Act for altering and amending an Act passed in the Twelfth Year of His present Majesty, intituled "An Act for lighting such Part of the Town of Islington as lies in the Parish of St. Mary, Islington, in the County of Middlesex, and for establishing a Regular Nightly Watch therein," (Note: London (Streets) Act 1772 (12 Geo. 3. c. 17)) and for removing and preventing Nuisances within the said Town and Parish. (Repealed by St. Mary Islington Improvement Act 1824 (5 Geo. 4. c. cxxv))
Road from Manchester through Salford to Eccles Act 1806 (repealed)	46 Geo. 3. c. ii	22 March 1806
An Act for making and maintaining a Road from Great Bridgewater Street, in Manchester, across the River Irwell, through Salford to Eccles, in the County Palatine of Lancaster, and several Branches of Road to communicate therewith. (Repealed by Road through Salford and Eccles Act 1827 (7 & 8 Geo. 4. c. ix))
West Riding of Yorkshire Court Houses Act 1806 (repealed)	46 Geo. 3. c. iii	22 March 1806
An Act to enable the Justices of the Peace for the West Riding of the County of York, to provide convenient Court Houses for holding the General Quarter Sessions of the Peace within the said Riding. (Repealed by Statute Law (Repeals) Act 2013 (c. 2))
Chertsey Parish Church Act 1806	46 Geo. 3. c. iv	22 March 1806
An Act for taking down and rebuilding the Body of the Parish Church of Chertsey, in the County of Surrey, and for repairing the Tower thereof, and building a Vestry Room near or adjoining to the said Church.
Rotherham and Pleasley Road Act 1806 (repealed)	46 Geo. 3. c. v	22 March 1806
An Act for enlarging the Term and Powers of Two Acts, of the Fourth (Note: Derby and Yorkshire Roads Act 1764 (4 Geo. 3. c. 65)) and Twenty fifth (Note: Rotherham Roads Act 1785 (25 Geo. 3. c. 105)) Years of His present Majesty, so far as relate to the Road from the South End of the Town of Rotherham, in the County of York, to the present Turnpike Road near Pleasley, in the County of Derby. (Repealed by Rotherham and Pleasley Turnpike Road Act 1826 (7 Geo. 4. c. lxxxviii))
Tinsley and Doncaster Road Act 1806 (repealed)	46 Geo. 3. c. vi	22 March 1806
An Act for enlarging the Term and Powers of Two Acts, of the Fourth (Note: Tinsley and Doncaster Road Act 1764 (4 Geo. 3. c. 64)) and Twenty fifth (Note: Doncaster Roads Act 1785 (25 Geo. 3. c. 104)) Years of His present Majesty, for amending and widening the Road from Tinsley, in the County of York, to the Town of Doncaster, in the said County. (Repealed by Tinsley and Doncaster Turnpike Road Act 1826 (7 Geo. 4. c. lxxxix))
Road from Wetherby to Grassington Act 1806 (repealed)	46 Geo. 3. c. vii	22 March 1806
An Act for continuing the Term, and altering the Powers, of Three Acts, passed in the Thirty second Year of His late Majesty, (Note: Wetherby to Grassington Road Act 1758 (32 Geo. 2. c. 71)) and in the Fourteenth (Note: Wetherby to Grassington Road Act 1774 (14 Geo. 3. c. 98)) and Twentieth (Note: Yorkshire Roads Act 1780 (20 Geo. 3. c. 86)) Years of His present Majesty, for repairing the Road from Wetherby to Grassington, in the County of York, so far as the said Acts relate to the Road from Knaresborough, to the Junction of the Road from Ripon to Pately Bridge. (Repealed by Road from Knaresborough to Ripon and Pateley Bridge Act 1826 (7 Geo. 4. c. xiv))
Roads in Salop Act 1806 (repealed)	46 Geo. 3. c. viii	22 March 1806
An Act for continuing the Term and altering and enlarging the Powers, of Two Acts, of the Fourth (Note: Salop Roads (No. 2) Act 1764 (4 Geo. 3. c. 81)) and Twenty fifth (Note: Salop Roads Act 1785 (25 Geo. 3. c. 101)) Years of His present Majesty, for repairing the Roads leading from the Buck's Head at Watling Street, and other Roads therein mentioned, in the County of Salop; and for making a new Branch of Road adjoining or near to the said Roads. (Repealed by Roads from Watling Street, Birches Brook and Ball's Hill (Salop.) Act 1827 (7 & 8 Geo. 4. c. xv))
Wymondham Inclosure Act 1806	46 Geo. 3. c. ix	22 March 1806
An Act for inclosing Lands in the Parish of Wymondham in the County of Norfolk.
East Ruston Inclosure Act 1806	46 Geo. 3. c. x	22 March 1806
An Act for inclosing Lands in the Parish of East Ruston, in the County of Norfolk.
Besthorpe Inclosure Act 1806	46 Geo. 3. c. xi	22 March 1806
An Act for enclosing Lands in the Parish of Besthorpe, in the County of Norfolk.
Huddersfield Narrow Canal Act 1806	46 Geo. 3. c. xii	31 March 1806
An Act to enable the Huddersfield canal-company to raise a further sum of money for the discharge of their debts, and to finish and complete the Huddersfield canal, and for amending the several acts passed for making and maintaining the said canal.
Road from Huddersfield to Rochdale Act 1806 (repealed)	46 Geo. 3. c. xiii	31 March 1806
An Act for making and maintaining a Road from the Town of Huddersfield, in the West Riding of the County of York, to a Place called New Hey, in the Parish of Rochdale, in the County Palatine of Lancaster, and for making and maintaining certain Branches of Road to communicate therewith. (Repealed by Road from Huddersfield to Rochdale Act 1825 (6 Geo. 4. c. cii))
Southampton Roads Act 1806 (repealed)	46 Geo. 3. c. xiv	31 March 1806
An Act to continue and amend Two Acts, passed in the Fifth (Note: Lymington Roads Act 1765 (5 Geo. 3. c. 59)) and Twenty sixth (Note: Lymington Roads Act 1786 (26 Geo. 3. c. 156)) Years of His present Majesty, for repairing several Roads leading from Lymington, in the County of Southampton; and for amending and widening the Road to Wilverley Post, in the New Forest. (Repealed by Lymington Roads Act 1828 (9 Geo. 4. c. cvii))
Roads from Callington Act 1806 (repealed)	46 Geo. 3. c. xv	31 March 1806
An Act for continuing the Term, and altering and enlarging the Powers of Two Acts, passed in the Fourth (Note: Callington Roads Act 1764 (4 Geo. 3. c. 48)) and Twenty fifth (Note: Cornwall Roads Act 1785 (25 Geo. 3. c. 108)) Years of His present Majesty, for repairing and widening several Roads leading from Callington in the County of Cornwall. (Repealed by Callington Roads (Cornwall) Act 1827 (7 & 8 Geo. 4. c. ci))
St. Sepulchre, City of London, Poor Relief Act 1806 (repealed)	46 Geo. 3. c. xvi	2 April 1806
An Act for enabling the Trustees for executing an Act, passed in the Thirty eighth Year of His present Majesty, intituled "An Act for rebuilding the Workhouse of the Parish of Saint Sepulchre, in the City of London, and for the better Relief and Employment of the Poor in the said Parish," (Note: St. Sepulchre's Workhouse Act 1798 (38 Geo. 3. c. xxxiv)) to raise a further Sum of Money for completing the Purposes of the said Act. (Repealed by Statute Law (Repeals) Act 2008 (c. 12))
Millbridge and Cleckheaton Road Act 1806 (repealed)	46 Geo. 3. c. xvii	2 April 1806
An Act for making and maintaining a Road from Millbridge to Cleckheaton, in the Parish of Birstall, all in the West Riding of the County of York. (Repealed by Road from Leeds to Whitehall (Yorkshire) Act 1825 (6 Geo. 4. c. xcvii))
Bawtry Bridge and Hainton Road Act 1806 (repealed)	46 Geo. 3. c. xviii	2 April 1806
An Act for continuing the Term, and altering and enlarging the Powers, of so much of Two Acts, passed in the Fifth (Note: Notts and Lincoln Roads Act 1765 (5 Geo. 3. c. 85)) and Twenty sixth (Note: Lincoln Roads (No. 3) Act 1786 (26 Geo. 3. c. 141)) Years of His present Majesty, for repairing the Road from Bawtry Bridge, in the County of Nottingham, to Hainton, in the County of Lincoln, and other Roads therein mentioned, as relates to the First and Second Districts of Roads therein described. (Repealed by Road from Bawtry Bridge to Hainton (Lincolnshire) Act 1827 (7 & 8 Geo. 4. c. lvii))
Milford Harbour Fisheries Act 1806	46 Geo. 3. c. xix	21 April 1806
An Act for the Regulation of the Oyster, Sole and Salmon Fisheries, within the Harbour of Milford, in the County of Pembroke, and the Rivers running into the said Harbour.
Rochdale Canal Act 1806	46 Geo. 3. c. xx	21 April 1806
An Act for enabling the Company of Proprietors of the Rochdale Canal more effectually to provide for the Discharge of their Debts, and to amend the several Acts passed for making and maintaining the said Canal.
King's Lynn Improvement Act 1806	46 Geo. 3. c. xxi	21 April 1806
An Act for amending, altering and enlarging the Powers of an Act, passed in the Forty third Year of His present Majesty, (Note: King's Lynn Improvements and Markets Act 1803 (43 Geo. 3. c. xxxvii)) for paving, and otherwise improving, the Borough of King's Lynn, in the County of Norfolk.
Christ's Hospital (West's Charities) Act 1806	46 Geo. 3. c. xxii	21 April 1806
An Act for regulating the Charities of John West of London, Gentleman, and Frances his Wife, both deceased.
Martock Inclosure Act 1806	46 Geo. 3. c. xxiii	21 April 1806
An Act for inclosing Lands in the Parish of Martock, in the County of Somerset.
Little Snoring Inclosure Act 1806	46 Geo. 3. c. xxiv	5 May 1806
An Act for inclosing Lands in the Parish of Little Snoring, in the County of Norfolk.
Scotforth Inclosure Act 1806	46 Geo. 3. c. xxv	5 May 1806
An Act for inclosing Lands in the Township of Scotforth, in the Parish of Lancaster, in the County Palatine of Lancaster.
Bristol Improvement Act 1806	46 Geo. 3. c. xxvi	5 May 1806
An Act for amending, altering and enlarging the Powers of several Acts, (Note: Bristol Roads and Avon and Frome Navigation Act 1698 (11 Will. 3. c. 23)) (Note: Bristol, Paving, etc. Act 1748 (22 Geo. 2. c. 20)) (Note: Bristol (Nightly Watch) Act 1755 (28 Geo. 2. c. 32)) (Note: Bristol Streets Act 1766 (6 Geo. 3. c. 34)) (Note: Bristol Harbour Act 1803 (43 Geo. 3. c. cxl)) passed for paving, pitching, cleansing and lighting, the Streets and other Places within the City of Bristol and Liberties thereof.
Colne Water Act 1806	46 Geo. 3. c. xxvii	5 May 1806
An Act for better supplying the Inhabitants of the Town and Township of Colne, in the County Palatine of Lancaster, with Water.
Lutterworth, Rugby and Bilton Road Act 1806 (repealed)	46 Geo. 3. c. xxviii	5 May 1806
An Act to continue and amend an Act made in the Twenty fifth Year of His present Majesty, (Note: Warwick Roads Act 1785 (25 Geo. 3. c. 115)) for repairing the Roads leading from Lutterworth Hand, on the Watling Street Road, through Churchover, Brownsover, Newhold upon Avon, Rugby and Bilton, in the County of Warwick, to the Turnpike Road between Dunchurch and Hillmorton, in the said County. (Repealed by Churchover, Brownsover, Newbold-upon-Avon, Rugby and Bilton Road Act 1828 (9 Geo. 4. c. lxxxviii))
Aberdeen Roads Act 1806 (repealed)	46 Geo. 3. c. xxix	5 May 1806
An Act to extend the Provisions of so much of an Act, passed in the Thirty ninth and Fortieth Years of His present Majesty, (Note: Aberdeen County Roads and Bridges Act 1800 (39 & 40 Geo. 3. c. xxxii)) as relates to repairing certain Turnpike Roads in the County of Aberdeen, to other Roads within the said County. (Repealed by Aberdeen, Banff and Kincardine Roads Act 1821 (1 & 2 Geo. 4. c. liii))
Alford, Boston and Cowbridge Road Act 1806 (repealed)	46 Geo. 3. c. xxx	5 May 1806
An Act to continue the Term and enlarge the Powers of Two Acts, passed in the Fifth (Note: Alford to Cowbridge Road Act 1765 (5 Geo. 3. c. 96)) and Twenty fourth (Note: Alford to Cowbridge Road Act 1784 (24 Geo. 3. Sess. 2. c. 62)) Years of His present Majesty, for repairing and widening the Road from Alford to Boston, and from thence to Cowbridge, in the County of Lincoln. (Repealed by Alford and Boston Road Act 1827 (7 & 8 Geo. 4. c. xvii))
York Judges' House Act 1806 (repealed)	46 Geo. 3. c. xxxi	23 May 1806
An Act to enable the Justices of the Peace for the County of York to provide a convenient House, with suitable Accommodations, for His Majesty's Judges of the Assizes at the said County. (Repealed by Statute Law (Repeals) Act 2013 (c. 2))
Egham and Rotherhithe Coal Trade Act 1806 (repealed)	46 Geo. 3. c. xxxii	23 May 1806
An Act for more effectually preventing Frauds and Abuses in the Admeasurement and Delivery of Coals within the several Parishes lying between the Parishes of Egham and Rotherhithe, both inclusive, in the County of Surrey. (Repealed by London, Westminster, Middlesex, Surrey, Kent and Essex Coal Trade Act 1807 (47 Geo. 3 Sess. 2. c. lxviii))
Scarborough Harbour Act 1806	46 Geo. 3. c. xxxiii	23 May 1806
An Act for altering and enlarging the Powers of several Acts made in the Fifth (Note: Scarborough Harbour Act 1731 (5 Geo. 2. c. 11)) and Twenty fifth (Note: Scarborough Harbour Act 1751 (25 Geo. 2. c. 44)) Years of King George the Second, and in the Third, (Note: Scarborough Pier Act 1763 (3 Geo. 3. c. 42)) Eighteenth (Note: Scarborough Pier Act 1778 (18 Geo. 3. c. 20)) and Forty first (Note: Scarborough Harbour Act 1801 (41 Geo. 3. (U.K.). c. lxix)) Years of His present Majesty, for enlarging the Pier and Harbour of Scarborough, in the County of York.
Porthdinlleyn Harbour Act 1806	46 Geo. 3. c. xxxiv	23 May 1806
An Act for erecting a pier and other works, for the improvement of the harbour of Porthdinlleyn, in Carnarvon Bay, in the county of Carnarvon.
Bristol Harbour Act 1806 (repealed)	46 Geo. 3. c. xxxv	23 May 1806
An Act to alter and amend an Act, passed in the Forty third Year of His present Majesty, intituled "An Act for improving and rendering more commodious the Port and Harbour of Bristol;" (Note: Bristol Harbour Act 1803 (43 Geo. 3. c. cxl)) and for extending the Powers and Provisions of the said Act. (Repealed by Bristol Dock Company Act 1848 (11 & 12 Vict. c. xliii))
Leith, Coalhill and Citadel Improvement Act 1806 (repealed)	46 Geo. 3. c. xxxvi	23 May 1806
An Act for amending an Act, passed in the Eleventh Year of His present Majesty, intituled "An Act for cleansing and lighting the Streets of the Town of South Leith, the Territory of Saint Anthony's and Yardheads, thereunto adjoining, and for supplying the several Parts thereof with Fresh Water," (Note: South Leith (Improvement) Act 1771 (11 Geo. 3. c. 30)) and for the better regulating the Police of the said Town and Territory, and of the Town of North Leith, Coalhill and Citadel, and for other Purposes therein mentioned relating thereto. (Repealed by Leith Municipal Government Act 1827 (7 & 8 Geo. 4. c. cxii))
Grimsby Court of Requests Act 1806 (repealed)	46 Geo. 3. c. xxxvii	23 May 1806
An Act for the more speedy and easy Recovery of Small Debts in the Town and Borough of Grimsby, and the Liberties thereof, and in the several Parishes and Places therein mentioned, in the County of Lincoln. (Repealed by County Courts Act 1846 (9 & 10 Vict. c. 95))
Cork City Gaol Act 1806	46 Geo. 3. c. xxxviii	23 May 1806
An Act for building a new Gaol for the County of the City of Cork, and for supplying the said Gaol with Water.
Exeter Improvement Act 1806 (repealed)	46 Geo. 3. c. xxxix	23 May 1806
An Act for better repairing the Streets, Lanes, and Passages, within the City of Exeter, and County of the said City, and for amending an Act, passed in the First Year of His present Majesty, intituled "An Act for enlightening the Streets within the City of Exeter and Suburbs thereof", (Note: Exeter (Lighting etc.) Act 1760 (1 Geo. 3. c. 28)) and for the better Regulation of the Watch within the said City and County, and for otherwise improving the same. (Repealed by Exeter Improvement Act 1810 (50 Geo. 3. c. cxlvi))
Boston (Lincolnshire) Improvement Act 1806	46 Geo. 3. c. xl	23 May 1806
An Act for amending and rendering more effectual, an Act, passed in the Thirty second Year of His present Majesty, (Note: Boston Improvement Act 1792 (32 Geo. 3. c. 80)) for better paving, cleansing and otherwise improving, the Borough of Boston, in the County of Lincoln.
Boston (Lincolnshire) Lighting and Watching Act 1806	46 Geo. 3. c. xli	23 May 1806
An Act for amending and rendering more effectual an Act, passed in the Sixteenth Year of His present Majesty, (Note: Boston (Streets) Act 1776 (16 Geo. 3. c. 25)) for lighting and watching the Streets, Lanes and other public Passages and Places, within the Borough of Boston, in the County of Lincoln, and for removing and preventing Nuisances therein.
City of Lichfield Improvement Act 1806	46 Geo. 3. c. xlii	23 May 1806
An Act for paving, cleansing, lighting, watching and regulating the Streets, Lanes and other public Passages and Places within the City of Litchfield, and the Suburbs thereof.
Lewes Improvement Act 1806 (repealed)	46 Geo. 3. c. xliii	23 May 1806
An Act for paving, lighting, cleansing, watching, repairing and improving the Roads, Streets, Lanes, and other public Passages and Places, within the Borough of Lewes, in the County of Sussex, and for removing and preventing Nuisances and Encroachments therein. (Repealed by East Sussex Act 1981 (c. xxv))
Norfolk Poor Relief Act 1806 (repealed)	46 Geo. 3. c. xliv	23 May 1806
An Act for the more effectual Relief and Employment of the Poor in the Parishes of Buxton, Hevingham, Marsham, Stratton Strawless, Swanton Abbot, Burgh next Aylsham, Skeyton, Brampton and Oxnead, in the County of Norfolk. (Repealed by Statute Law (Repeals) Act 2013 (c. 2))
Westgate Bridge (Gloucester) and Approaches Act 1806	46 Geo. 3. c. xlv	23 May 1806
An Act for taking down and rebuilding the Bridge across the River Severn, at Gloucester, called The Westgate Bridge, and for opening convenient Avenues thereto.
Road from Cosham to Chichester Act 1806 (repealed)	46 Geo. 3. c. xlvi	23 May 1806
An Act for repealing Two Acts, passed in the Second (Note: Cosham to Chichester Road Act 1762 (2 Geo. 3. c. 84)) and Twenty fourth (Note: Cosham to Chichester Road Act 1783 (24 Geo. 3. Sess. 1. c. 32)) Years of His present Majesty, for repairing the Road from Cosham, in the County of Southampton, to the City of Chichester, and for more effectually repairing the said Road. (Repealed by Road from Cosham to Chichester Act 1827 (7 & 8 Geo. 4. c. viii))
Warwick and Paddle Brook and Stratford-upon-Avon Roads Act 1806 (repealed)	46 Geo. 3. c. xlvii	23 May 1806
An Act for enlarging the Term and Powers of an Act, passed in Twentieth Year of His present Majesty, (Note: Warwick and Worcester Roads Act 1780 (20 Geo. 3. c. 71)) for more effectually repairing the Roads from Warwick to Paddle Brook, and from Warwick to Stratford upon Avon, in the Counties of Warwick and Worcester, and for repealing the Laws then in force relating to the said Roads. (Repealed by Warwick and Paddle Brook and Stratford-upon-Avon Roads Act 1827 (7 & 8 Geo. 4. c. xxvi))
Roxburgh and Berwick Roads and Bridges Act 1806	46 Geo. 3. c. xlviii	23 May 1806
An Act for more effectually repairing and amending certain Roads in the Counties of Roxburgh and Berwick, and for better regulating the Statute Labour, and making and repairing the High Roads and Bridges in the said County of Roxburgh.
Road through Holt and Melksham Act 1806 (repealed)	46 Geo. 3. c. xlix	23 May 1806
An Act for continuing the Term, and altering and enlarging the Powers, of Two Acts, passed in the Second (Note: Wilts Roads (No. 3) Act 1762 (2 Geo. 3. c. 59)) and Seventeenth (Note: Wilts Roads Act 1777 (17 Geo. 3. c. 72)) Years of His present Majesty, for repairing the Road leading from the Turnpike Road on Farrand's Common, through Holt and Melksham, to Homan's Stile, in the Parish of Lacock, in the County of Wilts. (Repealed by Road through Holt and Melksham (Wiltshire) Act 1826 (7 Geo. 4. c. xviii))
Gloucester and Crickley Hill Road Act 1806 (repealed)	46 Geo. 3. c. l	23 May 1806
An Act for more effectually repairing, widening and improving the Roads from the City of Gloucester to the Top of Birdlip Hill, and from the Foot of the said Hill to the Top of Crickley Hill, in the County of Gloucester. (Repealed by Gloucester, Birdlip Hill and Crickley Hill Roads Act 1827 (7 & 8 Geo. 4. c. xvi))
Spalding and Tydd Goat Road Act 1806 (repealed)	46 Geo. 3. c. li	23 May 1806
An Act to continue the Term, and enlarge the Powers, of Two Acts, passed in the Fourth (Note: Lincoln Roads Act 1764 (4 Geo. 3. c. 53)) and Twenty fifth (Note: Lincoln Roads Act 1785 (25 Geo. 3. c. 123)) Years of His present Majesty, for repairing and widening the Roads from the High Bridge in Spalding to a certain Place called Tydd Goat, in the County of Lincoln, and from Sutton Saint Mary's to Sutton Wash, in the said County. (Repealed by Spalding and Tydd Goat Road Act 1827 (7 & 8 Geo. 4. c. lvi))
Wiveliscombe Roads Act 1806 (repealed)	46 Geo. 3. c. lii	23 May 1806
An Act for continuing the Term, and altering and enlarging the Powers, of an Act, passed in the Twenty sixth Year of His present Majesty, (Note: Wiveliscombe Roads Act 1786 (26 Geo. 3. c. 135)) for amending and widening several Roads leading from and through the Town of Wiveliscombe, in the County of Somerset, and other Roads therein mentioned, and for amending and widening certain other Roads adjoining thereto. (Repealed by Wiveliscombe Roads Act 1825 (6 Geo. 4. c. xciii))
Road from Carlisle to Westlinton Bridge Act 1806 (repealed)	46 Geo. 3. c. liii	23 May 1806
An Act for amending and keeping in Repair, the Road leading from the Guide Post at the Top of Stanwix Bank, near the City of Carlisle, to Westlington Bridge, in the County of Cumberland. (Repealed by Roads from Carlisle to Edinburgh and Glasgow Act 1827 (7 & 8 Geo. 4. c. li))
Duke of Dorset's Estate Act 1806	46 Geo. 3. c. liv	23 May 1806
An Act to enable the Duchess Dowager of Dorset, or other the Guardians for the time being of the infant Children of the Most Noble John Frederick late Duke of Dorset, to execute Leases for long Terms of Years, and to execute Conveyances of Lands within the Manor of Bexhill, otherwise Beckesley, in the County of Sussex, for working Mines and other Substances within or under the same, and for other the Purposes within mentioned.
Hannah Bedford's Estate Act 1806	46 Geo. 3. c. lv	23 May 1806
An Act for vesting certain undivided Parts or Shares, devised by the Will of Hannah Bedford Widow, of and in several Estates in the Counties of Cornwall and Devon, in Trustees, to be sold, and for investing the clear Purchase Monies, under the Direction of the High Court of Chancery, in other Estates to be settled in lieu thereof, and to the same Uses.
Hartopp and Wigley Estates Act 1806	46 Geo. 3. c. lvi	23 May 1806
An Act for effecting an Exchange between Sir Edmund Craddock Hartopp Baronet, and Edward Hartopp Wigley Esquire, of Estates in the County of Leicester.
Rush Common (Lambeth and Wandsworth) Act 1806 or the Lambeth Manor Inclosure Act 1806	46 Geo. 3. c. lvii	23 May 1806
An Act for inclosing lands in the manor of Lambeth, in the county of Surrey.
Glasgow Hutchison Town Bridge Act 1806	46 Geo. 3. c. lviii	9 June 1806
An Act for maintaining a wooden Bridge over the River Clyde, from the City of Glasgow to Hutchinson Town, in the County of Lanark.
Port of London Improvement and London Dock Company Act 1806 (repealed)	46 Geo. 3. c. lix	9 June 1806
An Act to alter and amend several Acts, passed in the Fortieth, (Note: Port of London Improvement Act 1800 (39 & 40 Geo. 3. c. xlvii)) Forty fourth, (Note: Port of London Improvement Act 1804 (44 Geo. 3. c. ii)) and Forty fifth (Note: Port of London Improvement Act 1805 (45 Geo. 3. c. lviii)) Years of His present Majesty, for making Wet Docks, Basons, Cuts and other Works, for the greater Accommodation and Security of Shipping, Commerce and Revenue, within the Port of London; and for other the Purposes in the said Acts mentioned; and for enlarging the Powers thereby granted to the London Dock Company. (Repealed by London Docks Act 1828 (9 Geo. 4. c. cxvi))
Uxbridge Improvement Act 1806	46 Geo. 3. c. lx	9 June 1806
An Act for more effectually paving and keeping in Repair the Footways and Crosspaths, and lighting and cleansing the Streets, Lanes and other public Passages and Places, within the Town of Uxbridge, in the County of Middlesex, and for removing and preventing Nuisances and Annoyances therein, and for watching and watering the said Town.
Great Yarmouth Parish Church Act 1806	46 Geo. 3. c. lxi	9 June 1806
An Act for repairing the Parish Church of Great Yarmouth, in the County of Norfolk, and rebuilding the Tower thereof.
Roads from Selby to Leeds Act 1806	46 Geo. 3. c. lxii	9 June 1806
An Act for continuing the Term, and altering and enlarging the Powers, of several Acts, (Note: Leeds and Halifax Roads Act 1740 (14 Geo. 2. c. 32)) (Note: Leeds and Halifax Roads Act 1751 (25 Geo. 2. c. 55)) (Note: Bradford and Wakefield Road Act 1753 (26 Geo. 2. c. 83)) (Note: Leeds and Halifax Roads Act 1783 (23 Geo. 3. c. 94)) (Note: Yorkshire Roads Act 1794 (34 Geo. 3. c. 134)) passed for repairing the Roads from the Town of Selby to the Town of Leeds, and other Roads therein mentioned, so far as the same relate to the Roads leading from Leeds to Halifax, and the Roads called Bowling Lane and Little Horton Lane, all in the West Riding of the County of York.
Manchester to Austerlands Roads Act 1806 (repealed)	46 Geo. 3. c. lxiii	9 June 1806
An Act for more effectually improving the Roads from Manchester, in the County Palatine of Lancaster, through Oldham to Austerlands, in the Parish of Saddleworth, in the County of York, and from Oldham to Ashton under Lyne, and from Oldham to the Village of Royton, in the said County Palatine of Lancaster. (Repealed by Manchester and Austerlands Road Act 1825 (6 Geo. 4. c. lxxxiii))
Lowther and Lonsdale Estates Act 1806	46 Geo. 3. c. lxiv	9 June 1806
An Act for effecting an Exchange between the Right Honourable William Viscount Lowther and the Devises under the Will of the Right Honourable James late Earl of Lonsdale, and to enable the said William Viscount Lowther to enfranchise certain Copyhold or Customary Lands, Parcel or holden of certain Manors in the Counties of Westmorland and Cumberland, devised by the said Will, and for laying out the Money arising therefrom in the Purchase of other Estates, to be settled to the same Uses.
Cheslyn's Estate Act 1806	46 Geo. 3. c. lxv	9 June 1806
An Act for vesting certain Estates in or near Sweeting's Alley, in the City of London (Part of the Estates devised by the Wills of Ann Cheslyn and Frances Cheslyn Spinsters) in Trustees, in Trust to sell the same; and for laying out the Money arising from the Sale thereof in the Purchase of other Estates, to be settled to the same Uses as the Estates so sold.
Isle of Wight Court of Requests Act 1806 (repealed)	46 Geo. 3. c. lxvi	13 June 1806
An Act for the more easy and speedy recovery of small debts within the Isle of Wight, in the county of Southampton. (Repealed by County Courts Act 1846 (9 & 10 Vict. c. 95))
Norwich Improvement Act 1806 (repealed)	46 Geo. 3. c. lxvii	13 June 1806
An Act for better paving, lighting, cleansing, watching and otherwise improving the City of Norwich. (Repealed by Norwich City Council Act 1984 (c. xxiii))
St. Peter's Parish Church, St. Albans Act 1806	46 Geo. 3. c. lxviii	13 June 1806
An Act for enlarging the Powers of an Act, passed in the Forty third Year of His present Majesty, (Note: St. Peter's Church, St. Albans Act 1803 (43 Geo. 3. c. ix)) for rebuilding the Tower of the Parish Church of Saint Peter, in the Borough and Liberty of Saint Alban, in the County of Hertford, together with the Chancel thereof, and for more effectually repairing the said Parish Church.
Road from Dunchurch to Duston (Warwickshire) Act 1806 (repealed)	46 Geo. 3. c. lxix	13 June 1806
An Act for more effectually repairing the Road from Dunchurch to Hillmorton, in the County of Warwick, and from thence to Saint James's End, in the Parish of Duston, in the County of Northampton. (Repealed by Road from Dunchurch to Dustan (Warwickshire, Northamptonshire) Act 1827 (7 & 8 Geo. 4. c. liv))
Roads in Lincoln Act 1806 (repealed)	46 Geo. 3. c. lxx	13 June 1806
An Act for more effectually repairing the Roads from the North West Parts of the County of Lincoln, through Nettleham Fields, Wragby Lane and Baumber Fields, to the North East Part of the said County, and other Roads therein described, in the said County. (Repealed by North Lincolnshire Roads Act 1827 (7 & 8 Geo. 4. c. vii))
Road from Renfrew to Greenock and from Kilbarchan to Inchinnan Bridge Act 1806	46 Geo. 3. c. lxxi	13 June 1806
An Act for altering, amending and consolidating several Acts, (Note: Lincoln (City) Roads Act 1738 (12 Geo. 2. c. 10)) (Note: Lincoln Roads Act 1758 (32 Geo. 2. c. 44)) (Note: Lincoln Roads Act 1780 (20 Geo. 3. c. 75)) so far as the same relate to the Road from Renfrew to Greenock, and from Kilbarchan to Inchinnan Bridge, in the County of Renfrew.
Savile's Estate Act 1806	46 Geo. 3. c. lxxii	13 June 1806
An Act for vesting certain Estates devised by the Will of Sir George Saville Baronet, in Trustees, to be sold, and for laying out the Purchase Money, under the Direction of the High Court of Chancery, in other Estates to be settled in lieu thereof, and to the same Uses.
Llandwrog, Llanwnda and Llanfaglen Inclosure and Embanking Act 1806	46 Geo. 3. c. lxxiii	13 June 1806
An Act for inclosing and embanking Lands in the Parishes of Llandwrog, Llanwnda and Llanfaglen, in the County of Carnarvon.
Glasgow Streets and Slaughterhouses Act 1806	46 Geo. 3. c. lxxiv	20 June 1806
An Act for opening and improving certain Streets in the City of Glasgow, and for removing the Slaughter Houses in the said City to a more convenient Situation.
Glasgow, Paisley and Ardrossan Canal Act 1806	46 Geo. 3. c. lxxv	20 June 1806
An Act for making and maintaining a navigable Canal from the Harbour of Ardrossan, in the County of Ayr, to Tradestown, near Glasgow, in the County of Lanark, and a collateral Cut from the said Canal to the Coalworks at Hurlet, in the County of Renfrew.
Red Lion Square Improvement Act 1806 (repealed)	46 Geo. 3. c. lxxvi	20 June 1806
An Act to alter, explain, amend and enlarge the Powers of an Act, passed in the Tenth Year of His late Majesty, (Note: Saint Andrew, Holborn-above-bars (Watching, etc.) Act 1736 (10 Geo. 2. c. 15)) to enable the Proprietors and Inhabitants of the Houses in Red Lion Square, in the County of Middlesex, to make a Rate on themselves for raising Money sufficient to inclose, pave, watch, clean and adorn the said Square. (Repealed by London Government (Borough of Holborn) Order in Council 1901 (SR&O 1901/269))
St. George's Parish, Middlesex, Improvement Act 1806 (repealed)	46 Geo. 3. c. lxxvii	20 June 1806
An Act for more effectually maintaining, regulating and employing the Poor within the Parish of Saint George, in the County of Middlesex, and for cleansing and lighting the Squares, Streets and other Passages and Places, and for keeping and regulating a nightly Watch within such Parts of the said Parish as are not within the Liberty of the Tower of London. (Repealed by London Government (Borough of Stepney) Order in Council 1901 (SR&O 1901/276))
Sparham and Billingford Allotments Act 1806	46 Geo. 3. c. lxxviii	20 June 1806
An Act for allotting Lands in the Parishes of Sparham and Billingford, in the County of Norfolk.
Lord St. John's Estate Act 1806	46 Geo. 3. c. lxxix	20 June 1806
An Act for vesting Part of the settled Estates of Saint Andrew Lord Saint John in Trustees, to be sold, and for applying Part of the Purchase Monies arising therefrom, and the Purchase Monies of Part of the said Estates already sold under a Power of Sale, in paying off an Incumbrance upon such Estates, and for investing the Residue of such Monies, under the Direction of the High Court of Chancery, in the Purchase of other Estates, to be settled to the former Uses.
Lord Langdale's Estate Act 1806	46 Geo. 3. c. lxxx	20 June 1806
An Act for vesting certain Parts of the Estates, devised by the Will of the Right Honourable Marmaduke late Lord Langdale, in the County of York, and limited to other Uses by the Settlement made previous to the Marriage of the Honourable William Stourton with Catherine his Wife, in Trustees, upon Trust, to sell the same, and to lay out the Money arising from the Sale thereof in the Purchase of other Estates, to be settled to the subsisting Uses limited by the said Will and Settlement.
See of Durham Estate Act 1806	46 Geo. 3. c. lxxxi	20 June 1806
An Act for vesting several yearly Rents and Fines payable to the Lord Bishop of Durham, in Trustees, to be sold, and for enabling the Lord Bishop of Durham, and his Successors, to enfranchise certain Copyhold or Customary Estates holden of Manors belonging to the See of Durham, and for applying the Monies thence arising in the Purchase of Freehold Estates, to be settled upon the said Lord Bishop and his Successors.
Warner's Estate Act 1806	46 Geo. 3. c. lxxxii	20 June 1806
An Act for vesting Part of the Real Estates devised by the Will and Codicils of Henry Lee Warner Esquire, deceased, in new Trustees, during the Term of Five hundred Years, upon certain Trusts, created by the said Will and Codicils, and for authorizing, under the Direction and with the Approbation of the High Court of Chancery, the Sale of Estates lately belonging to the said Henry Lee Warner, which are situate in the Counties of Wilts, Somerset, Northampton and Kent, and in the City and County of the City of Canterbury, and for applying the clear Surplus of the Purchase Monies under the Direction of the said Court, in the Payment of Debts and Incumbrances affecting the Real Estates late of the said Henry Lee Warner, or in the Purchase of Estates in the County of Norfolk, to be settled to the Uses of the Estates so sold.
Clarke's Charity Lands Act 1806	46 Geo. 3. c. lxxxiii	20 June 1806
An Act to extend the Powers given to and vested in the Trustees of certain Lands in Manchester, Crumpsall and Tetlow, in the County of Lancaster, called Clarke's Charity Lands, by an Act made in the Thirty fifth Year of the Reign of His present Majesty, intituled "An Act to enable the Trustees of certain Lands in Manchester, Crumpsall and Tetlow, in the County of Lancaster, called Clarke's Charity Lands, to make Leases for Years upon Rack Rents, and also to grant Building Leases, and make Conveyances in Fee of and upon all or any Part of the said Lands under reserved Yearly Rents." (Note: Clarke's Charity Lands Act 1795 (35 Geo. 3. c. 53 Pr.))
Outram's Estate Act 1806	46 Geo. 3. c. lxxxiv	20 June 1806
An Act for enabling the Guardians of Francis Outram, an Infant, or of the Persons for the time being entitled to the Freehold in Possession of the Moiety of certain Estates situate in or near Ancoats Lane, Manchester, in the County Palatine of Lancaster, during their Minorities, to carry into Execution certain Contracts entered into with the several Persons therein named for Sale of Part thereof, and also for enabling such Guardians to convey the Residue in Fee Simple for building upon, reserving Rents or to make Building Leases thereof, or to join with the Owners for the time being of the other Moiety of the same Estates in carrying into Execution such Contracts, and in making such Conveyances or Leases respectively, and for other Purposes therein mentioned.
Griston Inclosure Act 1806	46 Geo. 3. c. lxxxv	20 June 1806
An Act for inclosing lands in the parish of Griston, in the county of Norfolk.
Moundford Inclosure Act 1806	46 Geo. 3. c. lxxxvi	3 July 1806
An Act for confirming and establishing a Division and Inclosure of the Open Fields in the Parish of Moundford, in the County of Norfolk.
Southwark and East Brixton Court of Requests Act 1806 (repealed)	46 Geo. 3. c. lxxxvii	3 July 1806
An Act to explain amend and render more effectual Two Acts, passed in the Twenty second (Note: Small Debts, Southwark, etc. Act 1748 (22 Geo. 2. c. 47)) and Thirty second (Note: Small Debts, Southwark, etc. Act 1758 (32 Geo. 2. c. 6)) Years of His late Majesty, for the more easy and speedy Recovery of Small Debts, within the Town and Borough of Southwark, and the several Parishes and Places in the said Acts mentioned. (Repealed by Statute Law (Repeals) Act 2013 (c. 2))
West Brixton Court of Requests Act 1806 (repealed)	46 Geo. 3. c. lxxxviii	3 July 1806
An Act to explain, amend and extend the Powers and Provisions of an Act, passed in the Thirty first Year of His late Majesty, (Note: Brixton Small Debts Act 1757 (31 Geo. 2. c. 23)) for the more easy and speedy Recovery of Small Debts, within the Western Division of the Hundred of Brixton, in the County of Surrey. (Repealed by County Courts Act 1846 (9 & 10 Vict. c. 95))
St. Mary's Whitechapel Improvement Act 1806 (repealed)	46 Geo. 3. c. lxxxix	3 July 1806
An Act for the better Relief, Maintenance and Employment of the Poor within the Parish of Saint Mary Whitechapel, in the County of Middlesex; for cleansing and lighting the Squares and other Passages and Places, and keeping a Nightly Watch, for raising Money for repairing the Highways in certain Parts of the said Parish; and for raising Money to repair the Church of the said Parish. (Repealed by London Government (Borough of Stepney) Order in Council 1901 (SR&O 1901/276))
St. Marylebone Improvement Act 1806	46 Geo. 3. c. xc	3 July 1806
An Act for altering and amending an Act, made in the Thirty fifth Year of His present Majesty, (Note: Saint Marylebone Improvement Act 1795 (35 Geo. 3. c. 73)) for watching, paving, cleansing and lighting the Parish of Saint Mary le bone, in the County of Middlesex, and for the better Relief and Maintenance of the Poor thereof.
Dunbar Harbour Improvement Act 1806	46 Geo. 3. c. xci	3 July 1806
An Act to provide a Fund for repairing and improving the Harbour of Dunbar, and other Public Works within the Burgh of Dunbar.
Birmingham Canal Navigations Act 1806 (repealed)	46 Geo. 3. c. xcii	3 July 1806
An Act for improving the Birmingham Canal Navigations. (Repealed by Birmingham Canal Navigations Act 1835 (5 & 6 Will. 4. c. xxxiv))
Croydon, Merstham and Godstone Iron Railway Act 1806 (repealed)	46 Geo. 3. c. xciii	3 July 1806
An Act for better enabling the Company of Proprietors of the Croydon, Merstham and Godstone Iron Railway to complete the same. (Repealed by Croydon, Merstham and Godstone Iron Railway Dissolution Act 1839 (2 & 3 Vict. c. lii))
Surrey Iron Railway Act 1806 (repealed)	46 Geo. 3. c. xciv	3 July 1806
An Act for better enabling the Company of Proprietors of the Surrey Iron Railway, to complete the same. (Repealed by Surrey Iron Railway Act 1846 (9 & 10 Vict. c. cccxxxiii))
Bedford Level (South Level) Drainage Act 1806	46 Geo. 3. c. xcv	3 July 1806
An Act for more effectually draining and preserving certain Fen Lands lying in the South Level, Part of the Great Level of the Fens called Bedford Level, between Brandon River and Sam's Cut Drain.
Fen Lands Drainage Act 1806	46 Geo. 3. c. xcvi	3 July 1806
An Act for altering, amending, and rendering more effectual, two acts of the twenty-second year of King George the Second, (Note: Isle of Ely Drainage Act 1748 (22 Geo. 2. c. 11)) and the seventeenth year of his present Majesty, (Note: Bedford Level (Drainage) Act 1777 (17 Geo. 3. c. 65)) so far as relate to draining and preserving certain fen lands and low grounds lying in the parishes of Sutton, Mepal, Witcham, Chatteris, and a place called Byal Fen, in the Isle of Ely, and county of Cambridge, and for adding thereto certain other fen lands in Sutton and Chatteris, lying contiguous to the lands described in the said acts.
City of London Lottery Act 1806 (repealed)	46 Geo. 3. c. xcvii	3 July 1806
An Act to enable the several Persons therein named to dispose of several Houses in Picket Street, Temple Bar, in the Parish of Saint Clement Danes, in the County of Middlesex, and in Skinner Street, Snow Hill, and on Snow Hill, and in Fleet Market, in the Parish of Saint Sepulchre, in the City of London, by Lottery. (Repealed by Statute Law (Repeals) Act 2013 (c. 2))
Road from Cavendish Bridge to Brassington Act 1806 (repealed)	46 Geo. 3. c. xcviii	3 July 1806
An Act for enlarging the Term and Powers of an Act, of the Seventeenth Year of His present Majesty, (Note: Derby Roads (No. 2) Act 1777 (17 Geo. 3. c. 101)) for repairing the Road leading from the North Side of Cavendish Bridge, in the County of Derby, through the Town of Derby, to Brassington, in the said County. (Repealed by Road from Cavendish Bridge to Hulland Ward (Derbyshire) Act 1827 (7 & 8 Geo. 4. c. l))
Roads from James Deeping Stone Bridge though Stamford to Morcot Act 1806 (repealed)	46 Geo. 3. c. xcix	3 July 1806
An Act for continuing the Term and altering and enlarging the Powers of Two Acts, passed in the Second (Note: Lincoln and Rutland Roads Act 1762 (2 Geo. 3. c. 73)) and Twenty sixth (Note: Lincoln and Rutland Roads Act 1786 (26 Geo. 3. c. 159)) Years of His present Majesty, for repairing the Roads from a certain Bridge, called James Deeping Stone Bridge, to Peter's Gate, in Stamford, in the County of Lincoln, and from thence to the South End of the Town of Morcot, in the County of Rutland. (Repealed by Road from James Deeping Stone Bridge to Stamford and to Morcott Act 1829 (10 Geo. 4. c. lxxviii))
Romsey Road Act 1806 (repealed)	46 Geo. 3. c. c	3 July 1806
An Act for enlarging the Term and Powers of Two Acts, of the Fourth and Twenty fifth Years of His present Majesty, for repairing the Road from the End of Stanbridge Lane, in the Parish of Romsey, to the Turnpike Road at Middle Wallop, and other Roads therein mentioned, in the County of Southampton. (Repealed by Romsey, Stockbridge and Wallop Roads Act 1827 (7 & 8 Geo. 4. c. lxi))
Kilcullen and Carlow Road Act 1806 (repealed)	46 Geo. 3. c. ci	3 July 1806
An Act for amending and repairing of the Road leading from the Town of Kilcullen, in the County of Kildare, to the Town of Carlow. (Repealed by Kilcullen and Carlow Road Act 1827 (7 & 8 Geo. 4. c. lxv))
Beaconsfield and Uxbridge Road Act 1806 (repealed)	46 Geo. 3. c. cii	3 July 1806
An Act for more effectually repairing and improving the Road leading from the West End of the Town of Beaconsfield, in the County of Buckingham, to within Half a Mile of the River Colne, near Uxbridge, in the County of Middlesex. (Repealed by Beaconsfield and Uxbridge Road Act 1828 (9 Geo. 4. c. vi))
Pateley Bridge to Grassington District of Road Act 1806	46 Geo. 3. c. ciii	3 July 1806
An Act for more effectually repairing and improving the Road leading from the West End of the Town of Beaconsfield, in the County of Buckingham, to within Half a Mile of the River Colne, near Uxbridge, in the County of Middlesex.
Mellish's Estate Act 1806	46 Geo. 3. c. civ	3 July 1806
An Act for effecting the Sale of certain Real Estates, and of certain Leasehold Tythes, late of Charles Mellish Esquire, deceased, and for applying the Purchase Monies in discharge of Incumbrances, and for laying out the Surplus under the Direction of the High Court of Chancery, in the Purchase of other Estates, to be settled to the former Uses.
Inglishcombe Tythes Act 1806	46 Geo. 3. c. cv	3 July 1806
An Act for ascertaining the Farms and Lands in the Parish of Inglishcombe, in the County of Somerset, of which the Great Tythes shall be paid to or taken by the Vicar for the time being of that Parish.
Scrope's Estate Act 1806	46 Geo. 3. c. cvi	3 July 1806
An Act for vesting Part of the devised Estates of Thomas Scrope, of Coleby, in the County of Lincoln, Esquire, deceased, in Trustees, to be sold, and for laying out the clear Purchase Monies, under the Direction of the High Court of Chancery, in the Purchase of other Estates to be settled in lieu thereof, and to the same Uses.
Wormegay Inclosure and Drainage Act 1806 (repealed)	46 Geo. 3. c. cvii	3 July 1806
An Act for inclosing and draining lands in the honor, manor, and parish of Wormegay, in the county of Norfolk. (Repealed by Nar Valley Drainage Act 1881 (44 & 45 Vict. c. clxxix))
Newby Inclosure Act 1806	46 Geo. 3. c. cviii	3 July 1806
An Act for inclosing lands in the manor of Newby, in the county of Westmorland.
Cliburn Inclosure Act 1806	46 Geo. 3. c. cix	3 July 1806
An Act for inclosing lands in the manor of Cliburn, in the county of Westmorland.
Ampthill Inclosure Act 1806	46 Geo. 3. c. cx	3 July 1806
An Act for inclosing Lands in the Parish of Ampthill, in the County of Bedford.
Chiswick Inclosure Act 1806	46 Geo. 3. c. cxi	3 July 1806
An Act for extinguishing all Right of Common over certain Parcels of Land in the Parish of Chiswick, in the County of Middlesex.
Holme Cultram Inclosure Act 1806	46 Geo. 3. c. cxii	3 July 1806
An Act for inclosing Lands in the Manor and Parish of Holme Cultram, in the County of Cumberland.
East India Docks Act 1806 (repealed)	46 Geo. 3. c. cxiii	12 July 1806
An Act for altering and enlarging the Powers of an Act, made in the Forty third Year of His present Majesty, (Note: East India Docks Act 1803 (43 Geo. 3. c. cxxvi)) for the further Improvement of the Port of London, by making Docks and other Works at Blackwall, for the Accommodation of the East India Shipping in the said Port. (Repealed by East India Docks Act 1828 (9 Geo. 4. c. xcv))
Stockport, Brinnington, Edgeley and Brinksway Court of Requests Act 1806 (repealed)	46 Geo. 3. c. cxiv	12 July 1806
An Act for the more easy and speedy Recovery of Small Debts within the Townships of Stockport and Brinnington, and within the Hamlets of Edgeley and Brinksway, all in the County Palatine of Chester. (Repealed by County Courts Act 1846 (9 & 10 Vict. c. 95))
Whitehaven Improvement Act 1806	46 Geo. 3. c. cxv	12 July 1806
An Act for continuing and amending several Acts of Parliament (Note: Whitehaven Harbour Act 1708 (7 Ann. c. 9)) (Note: Whitehaven Harbour Act 1711 (10 Ann. c. 17)) (Note: Whitehaven Harbour Improvement Act 1739 (13 Geo. 2. c. 14)) (Note: Whitehaven Improvement Act 1760 (1 Geo. 3. c. 44)) (Note: Whitehaven Improvement Act 1762 (2 Geo. 3. c. 87)) (Note: Whitehaven Improvement Act 1788 (28 Geo. 3. c. 61)) (Note: Whitehaven Improvement Act 1792 (32 Geo. 3. c. 75)) for improving the Port, Harbour and Town of Whitehaven, in the County of Cumberland.
Paisley Improvement Act 1806 (repealed)	46 Geo. 3. c. cxvi	12 July 1806
An Act for paving, lighting, cleansing and watching the Burgh of Paisley, and Suburbs thereof; for improving and forming certain Streets, and erecting a Bridewell or Workhouse therein; and for regulating the Police and Markets. (Repealed by Paisley Gaslight Act 1845 (8 & 9 Vict. c. xviii))
Cheltenham Improvement Act 1806 (repealed)	46 Geo. 3. c. cxvii	12 July 1806
An Act for amending and enlarging the Powers of an Act passed in the Twenty sixth Year of His present Majesty, (Note: Cheltenham (Streets) Act 1786 (26 Geo. 3. c. 116)) for paving the Footways and Passages in the Town of Cheltenham, in the County of Gloucester, and for better cleansing and lighting the said Town, and for removing and preventing Nuisances and Annoyances therein. (Repealed by Cheltenham Improvement Act 1821 (1 & 2 Geo. 4. c. cxxi))
Daventry Improvement, Market and Moot Hall Act 1806	46 Geo. 3. c. cxviii	12 July 1806
An Act for paving, cleansing, lighting and watching the Town of Daventry, in the County of Northampton, and for regulating the Market the Market there; and for enabling the Bailiff, Burgesses and Commonalty of the Borough of Daventry, to purchase the Moot Hall, and to rebuild the same.
West Middlesex Waterworks Act 1806	46 Geo. 3. c. cxix	12 July 1806
An Act for supplying with Water the Inhabitants of Kensington, Hammersmith, Brentford, Battersea, Putney, Richmond and several other Parishes and Places in the Counties of Middlesex and Surrey.
Forth and Clyde Navigation Act 1806	46 Geo. 3. c. cxx	12 July 1806
An Act to alter and amend the several Acts passed for making and maintaining the Forth and Clyde Navigation.
River Ribble Navigation Act 1806 (repealed)	46 Geo. 3. c. cxxi	12 July 1806
An Act for improving the Navigation of the River Ribble, in the County Palatine of Lancaster. (Repealed by River Ribble Navigation Act 1838 (1 & 2 Vict. c. viii))
River Ouse Navigation (Sussex) Act 1806	46 Geo. 3. c. cxxii	12 July 1806
An Act for altering, amending and rendering more effectual, an Act passed in the Thirtieth Year of His present Majesty, (Note: River Ouse Navigation Act 1790 (30 Geo. 3. c. 52)) for improving the Navigation of the River Ouse, in the County of Sussex.
Parish of St. George Dublin Act 1806	46 Geo. 3. c. cxxiii	12 July 1806
An Act for altering and enlarging the Provisions of an Act passed in the Parliament of Ireland, in the Thirty third Year of His present Majesty, (Note: St. George's Parish Act 1793 (33 Geo. 3. c. 53 (I))) for making and constituting a new Parish, by the Name of The Parish of Saint George, on the Ground adjoining the City of Dublin therein described, and for erecting and building a Parish Church therein.
St. Marylebone Parish Additional Cemetery and Chapel Act 1806 (repealed)	46 Geo. 3. c. cxxiv	12 July 1806
An Act to enable the Vestrymen of the Parish of Saint Mary le bone, in the County of Middlesex, to provide an additional Cemetery or Burial Ground for the said Parish, and to erect a Chapel therein, and also other Buildings and Conveniences for the Residence of a Clergyman, Clerk and Sexton, and for other Purposes relating thereto. (Repealed by St. Marylebone Parish Church and Chapels Act 1811 (51 Geo. 3. c. cli))
Roads to the West and East India Docks Act 1806 (repealed)	46 Geo. 3. c. cxxv	12 July 1806
An Act for altering and enlarging the Term and Powers of Two Acts made in the Forty second (Note: Roads from West India Docks Act 1802 (42 Geo. 3. c. ci)) and Forty fourth (Note: West India Docks, Cannon Street and East India Docks Roads Act 1804 (44 Geo. 3. c. xxxvii)) Years of the Reign of His present Majesty, for making, maintaining, watching, lighting and watering, several Roads to communicate with the West India Docks in the Isle of Dogs, in the County of Middlesex, and also of several Acts for repairing the Cannon Street Road, in the said County; and also for making, maintaining, watching, lighting, and watering a new Branch, to communicate with the East India Docks. (Repealed by Commercial and East India and Barking Roads Act 1828 (9 Geo. 4. c. cxii))
Newmarket Heath Road Act 1806 (repealed)	46 Geo. 3. c. cxxvi	12 July 1806
An Act to continue and amend Two Acts passed in the Third (Note: Newmarket and Cambridge Road Act 1763 (3 Geo. 3. c. 32)) and Fifteenth (Note: Newmarket to Cambridge Road Act 1775 (15 Geo. 3. c. 68)) Years of His present Majesty, for repairing the Road from Newmarket, over Newmarket Heath, to the Turnpike Road leading to Stump Cross, in the Counties of Cambridge and Suffolk, and other Roads mentioned in the said Acts. (Repealed by Newmarket Heath Road Act 1829 (10 Geo. 4. c. liii))
Whitehaven Roads Act 1806 (repealed)	46 Geo. 3. c. cxxvii	12 July 1806
An Act for more effectually improving the Roads leading to and from the Port, Harbour and Town of Whitehaven, in the County of Cumberland. (Repealed by Whitehaven Roads Act 1828 (9 Geo. 4. c. x))
Flitwick Inclosure Act 1806	46 Geo. 3. c. cxxviii	12 July 1806
An Act for inclosing Lands in the Parish of Flitwick, in the County of Bedford.
Eversholt Inclosure Act 1806	46 Geo. 3. c. cxxix	12 July 1806
An Act for inclosing Lands in the Parish of Evershot, in the County of Bedford.
Croydon Court House, Market House and Burial Ground Act 1806	46 Geo. 3. c. cxxx	16 July 1806
An Act for rebuilding the Court House and Butter Market House of the Town of Croydon, in the County of Surrey, for providing an additional Burial Ground, and for selling certain Waste Lands belonging to the said Parish.
Brand's Estate Act 1806	46 Geo. 3. c. cxxxi	16 July 1806
An Act for exchanging Part of the Fee Simple Estate of the Honourable Thomas Brand, in the County of Hertford, for other his settled Estates in the said County of Hertford, and in the Counties of Essex, Cambridge and Surrey, and in the City of London.
Port of London Act 1806 (repealed)	46 Geo. 3. c. cxxxii	21 July 1806
An Act for altering and enlarging the Powers of an Act, made in the Thirty ninth Year of His present Majesty, intituled "An Act for rendering more commodious, and for better regulating the Port of London," (Note: Port of London Improvement and City Canal Act 1799 (39 Geo. 3. c. lxix)) so far as the same relates to the Compensations to be made by certain Commissioners therein named. (Repealed by Statute Law (Repeals) Act 2013 (c. 2))
East India Company and the Nabobs of the Carnatic Act 1806 (repealed)	46 Geo. 3. c. cxxxiii	21 July 1806
An Act for enabling the Commissioners acting in Execution of an Agreement made between the East India Company and the private Creditors of the Nabobs of the Carnatic, the better to carry the same into Effect. (Repealed by Statute Law (Repeals) Act 2008 (c. 12))
Bloomsbury Square Act 1806	46 Geo. 3. c. cxxxiv	21 July 1806
An Act for ornamenting and embellishing the Centre or Area of Bloomsbury Square in the Parish of Saint George Bloomsbury, in the County of Middlesex; and for preventing Hackney Coaches standing or plying for Hire in and near the said Square.
Beverley Court of Requests Act 1806 (repealed)	46 Geo. 3. c. cxxxv	21 July 1806
An Act to alter, amend and enlarge the Powers of an Act, passed in the Twenty first Year of His present Majesty, (Note: Beverley (Small Debts) Act 1781 (21 Geo. 3. c. 38)) for the more easy and speedy Recovery of Small Debts within the Town and Liberties of Beverley, in the County of York. (Repealed by County Courts Act 1846 (9 & 10 Vict. c. 95))
Glasgow Water Act 1806	46 Geo. 3. c. cxxxvi	21 July 1806
An Act for supplying the City and Suburbs of Glasgow with Water.
Roads through Cheltenham Act 1806 (repealed)	46 Geo. 3. c. cxxxvii	21 July 1806
An Act for continuing the Term and enlarging the Powers of an Act, passed in the Twenty fifth Year of His present Majesty, (Note: Cheltenham Roads Act 1785 (25 Geo. 3. c. 125)) for repairing the Roads from a Place called Piffs Elm, in the Tewkesbury Turnpike Road, through Cheltenham, to Elston Church, and other Roads therein mentioned, in the County of Gloucester. (Repealed by Roads through Cheltenham Act 1824 (5 Geo. 4. c. c))
Scottish Highlands Roads and Bridges Act 1806	46 Geo. 3. c. cxxxviii	21 July 1806
An Act for assessing the Proprietors of Lands in the County of Caithness, towards the Expence of supporting such Roads and Bridges therein as shall be approved of by the Commissioners for making Roads and building Bridges in the Highlands of Scotland.
Barnstaple Roads Act 1806 (repealed)	46 Geo. 3. c. cxxxix	21 July 1806
An Act for continuing the Term and altering and enlarging the Powers of Two Acts, passed in the Third (Note: Barnstaple Roads Act 1763 (3 Geo. 3. c. 35)) and Twenty fourth (Note: Barnstaple Roads Act 1783 (24 Geo. 3. Sess. 1. c. 31)) Years of His present Majesty, for repairing several Roads leading from the Town of Barnstaple, in the County of Devon. (Repealed by Barnstaple Roads Act 1827 (7 & 8 Geo. 4. c. xiv))
St. John's Church, Beverley, Curates and Curates' Stipends Act 1806	46 Geo. 3. c. cxl	21 July 1806
An Act for appointing new Trustees of certain Estates in the County of Lincoln, and for authorizing the Application of Part of the Rents and Profits thereof, and of other Estates, towards the Augmentation of the Stipends of the Curates of the late Collegiate Church of Saint John of Beverley, in the County of York, and for appointing another Assistant Curate of the said Church, and for other Purposes therein mentioned.
O'Reilly's Marriage Settlement Act 1806	46 Geo. 3. c. cxli	21 July 1806
An Act for raising, by Sale or Mortgage, a Sum of Money sufficient to pay off and discharge certain Incumbrances affecting certain Estates mentioned in a Deed of Settlement, bearing Date the Eleventh Day of September One thousand seven hundred and ninety nine, made on the Intermarriage of James O'Reilly, of Baltrasna, in the County of Meath, Esquire, and Henrietta Nugent, his Wife; and for the more effectually carrying into Execution the Trusts of said Deed, and of certain other Deeds therein and herein particularly mentioned.
Denny's Estate Act 1806	46 Geo. 3. c. cxlii	21 July 1806
An Act for vesting the settled Estates of Sir Edward Denny Baronet, of Tralee, in the County of Kerry, in Trustees, to be sold for the Payment of certain Incumbrances affecting the same, under the Directions of the Court of Chancery in Ireland, and for other Purposes therein mentioned.
Deptford Charity Lands Act 1806	46 Geo. 3. c. cxliii	21 July 1806
An Act for enabling the Trustees of certain Charity Lands at Deptford, in the County of Kent, to grant Building Leases thereof.
Philanthropic Society's Act 1806 (repealed)	46 Geo. 3. c. cxliv	22 July 1806
An Act for establishing and well governing the Charitable Institution, commonly called The Philanthropic Society, formed for the Protection of Poor Children, the Offspring of Convicted Felons; and for the Reformation of Children who have themselves been engaged in Criminal Practices; and for incorporating the Subscribers thereto, and for the better empowering and enabling them to carry on their charitable and useful Designs. (Repealed by Statute Law (Repeals) Act 2013 (c. 2))
Roads from Maidenhead Bridge to Reading and to Henley Bridge Act 1806	46 Geo. 3. c. cxlv	22 July 1806
An Act for more effectually repairing and improving the roads leading from Maidenhead-Bridge to Reading, and from the said bridge to Henley-Bridge, (Note: Henley Bridge in Henley-on-Thames. 51°32′15″N 0°54′01″W) in the county of Berks.
Eyre's Estate Act 1806	46 Geo. 3. c. cxlvi	22 July 1806
An Act for vesting part of the settled estates of Susannah Harriot Eyre, the wife of William Eyre esquire, in trustees, to be sold, and for applying part of the purchase-monies in paying off incumbrances and charges upon such estates, and for laying out the residue of the purchase-monies in the purchase of other estates to be settled to the former uses.
Wadham College, Oxford, Warden Act 1806	46 Geo. 3. c. cxlvii	22 July 1806
An Act for enabling a married Person to hold and enjoy the Office of Warden of Wadham College, in the University of Oxford.

=== Private acts ===
Short title	Citation	Royal assent
Long title
Holm's Naturalization Act 1806	46 Geo. 3. c. 1 Pr.	12 February 1806
An act for naturalizing John Dioderick Holm.
Houghton Conquest Inclosure Act 1806	46 Geo. 3. c. 2 Pr.	22 March 1806
An act for inclosing lands in the parish of Houghton-Conquest, in the county of Bedford.
Moreton Baggot Inclosure Act 1806	46 Geo. 3. c. 3 Pr.	22 March 1806
An act for inclosing lands in the parish of Moreton Baggot, in the county of Warwick.
Countess of Mangden's Naturalization Act 1806	46 Geo. 3. c. 4 Pr.	22 March 1806
An act for naturalizing Sophia countess of Mengden and baroness of Plettenberg, in the circle of Westphalia, in the empire of Germany.
Rucker's Naturalization Act 1806	46 Geo. 3. c. 5 Pr.	22 March 1806
An act for naturalizing Seigmund Rucker.
Witchford Inclosure Act 1806	46 Geo. 3. c. 6 Pr.	31 March 1806
An act for inclosing lands in the parish of Witchford in the Isle of Ely, in the county of Cambridge.
Knoblock's Naturalization Act 1806	46 Geo. 3. c. 7 Pr.	31 March 1806
An act for naturalizing Thomas Adolphus Knoblock.
Miéville's Naturalization Act 1806	46 Geo. 3. c. 8 Pr.	31 March 1806
An act for naturalizing Andrew Amedée Mieville.
Elsternwick Inclosure Act 1806	46 Geo. 3. c. 9 Pr.	21 April 1806
An act for inclosing lands in the township of Elsternwick, in the parish of Humbleton, in the east-riding of the county of York.
Owthorn Inclosure Act 1806	46 Geo. 3. c. 10 Pr.	21 April 1806
An act for inclosing lands in the township and parish of Owthorn, in the east-riding of the county of York.
Duff's Estate Act 1806	46 Geo. 3. c. 11 Pr.	5 May 1806
An act for vesting certain parts of the barony of Crimond, called Logie, in the county of Aberdeen, and a portion of the common of Cowie, comprised in a deed of entail executed by vice-admiral Robert Duff, upon the thirteenth day of March one thousand seven hundred and eighty-three, in trustees, to be sold, and for applying the purchase-money in the purchase of other estates to be settled upon the same series of heirs, and under the conditions and limitations contained in the said deed of entail, and for feuing certain parts of the barony of Fetteresso, in the county of Kincardine.
Dacre Inclosure Act 1806	46 Geo. 3. c. 12 Pr.	5 May 1806
An act for inclosing lands in the township of Dacre and Soulby, in the manor and parish of Dacre, in the county of Cumberland.
Hampreston Inclosure Act 1806	46 Geo. 3. c. 13 Pr.	5 May 1806
An act for inclosing lands in the parish of Hampreston, in the counties of Dorset and Southampton.
Staffield Inclosure Act 1806	46 Geo. 3. c. 14 Pr.	5 May 1806
An act for inclosing lands in the manor of Staffield, other wise Staffell, in the parish of Kirkoswald, in the county of Cumberland.
Hope Inclosure Act 1806	46 Geo. 3. c. 15 Pr.	5 May 1806
An act for inclosing lands in the hamlets of Hope, Bradwell, Aston, and Thornhill, in the parish of Hope, in the county of Derby.
Kingsley Inclosure Act 1806	46 Geo. 3. c. 16 Pr.	5 May 1806
An act for inclosing lands in the manor of Kingsley, otherwise Kinfare, in the parish of Tettenhall, in the county of Stafford.
Bridgnorth Inclosure Act 1806	46 Geo. 3. c. 17 Pr.	5 May 1806
An act for inclosing lands in the several manors and parishes of Worfield and Claverley, and in the several parishes of Saint Mary Magdalene and Quatford, within the town and liberties of Bridgnorth, in the county of Salop.
Monxton Inclosure Act 1806	46 Geo. 3. c. 18 Pr.	23 May 1806
An act for inclosing lands in the manor and parish of Monxton, in the county of Southampton.
Troston Inclosure Act 1806	46 Geo. 3. c. 19 Pr.	23 May 1806
An act for inclosing lands in the parish of Troston, in the county of Suffolk.
Cheam Inclosure Act 1806	46 Geo. 3. c. 20 Pr.	23 May 1806
An act for inclosing lands in the parish of Cheame, in the county of Surrey.
Llandanwg, &c. Inclosure Act 1806	46 Geo. 3. c. 21 Pr.	23 May 1806
An act for inclosing lands in the parishes of Llandanwg and Llanfihangel-y-Traethau, in the county of Merioneth.
Bushey Inclosure Act 1806	46 Geo. 3. c. 22 Pr.	23 May 1806
An act for inclosing lands in the parish of Bushey, in the county of Hertford.
Sherfield English Inclosure Act 1806	46 Geo. 3. c. 23 Pr.	23 May 1806
An act for inclosing lands in the parish of Sherfield-English, in the county of Southampton.
Sand Hutton Inclosure Act 1806	46 Geo. 3. c. 24 Pr.	23 May 1806
An act for allotting lands in the township of Sand-Hutton, in the parish of Bossall, in the north-riding of the county of York.
Hackford Inclosure Act 1806	46 Geo. 3. c. 25 Pr.	23 May 1806
An act for dividing lands in the parish of Hackford, in the county of Norfolk.
Gotherington Inclosure Act 1806	46 Geo. 3. c. 26 Pr.	23 May 1806
An act for inclosing lands in the hamlet of Gotherington, in the parish of Bishops-Cleeve, in the county of Gloucester.
Bowness Inclosure Act 1806	46 Geo. 3. c. 27 Pr.	23 May 1806
An act for inclosing lands in the manor, district, and liberties of Bowness, in the barony of Burgh, in the county of Cumberland.
Brinkworth Inclosure Act 1806	46 Geo. 3. c. 28 Pr.	23 May 1806
An act for inclosing lands in the parish of Brinkworth, in the county of Wilts.
Llanddeiniolen Inclosure Act 1806	46 Geo. 3. c. 29 Pr.	23 May 1806
An act for inclosing lands in the parish of Llandeniolen, in the county of Carnarvon.
Wohlmann's Naturalization Act 1806	46 Geo. 3. c. 30 Pr.	23 May 1806
An act for naturalizing John Christian Wohlmann.
Williams's Estate Act 1806	46 Geo. 3. c. 31 Pr.	9 June 1806
An act to enable the guardians of Jane Magdaline Williams, Elizabeth Williams, and Maria Catharine Williams, infants, to grant a lease, with the approbation of the court of Chancery, of certain veins of coal, culm, and iron-ore, in the parish of Cadoxstone, (Note: Cadoxton-juxta-Neath, Neath Port Talbot.) near Neath, in the county of Glamorgan.
Bell's Estate Act 1806	46 Geo. 3. c. 32 Pr.	9 June 1806
An act for vesting certain estates in the county of York, strictly entailed by the will of Ralph Bell, late of Thirsk, in the county of York, esquire, deceased, in trustees, to be sold; and for investing the money arising therefrom, under the direction of the court of Chancery, in the purchase of other estates in the county of York, to be settled to the same uses.
Harrow Inclosure Act 1806	46 Geo. 3. c. 33 Pr.	9 June 1806
An act for amending an act made in the forty-third year of his present Majesty, (Note: Harrow Inclosure Act 1803 (43 Geo. 3. c. 43 Pr.)) for dividing, allotting, and inclosing the open and common fields, commons, and waste grounds, within the parish of Harrow, in the county of Middlesex.
Kirkby Hill Inclosure Act 1806	46 Geo. 3. c. 34 Pr.	9 June 1806
An act for inclosing lands in the townships of Kirkby-Hill and Langthorpe, in the north-riding of the county of York.
Offord Darcey Inclosure Act 1806	46 Geo. 3. c. 35 Pr.	9 June 1806
An act for inclosing lands in the parish of Offord -Darcey, in the county of Huntingdon.
Llanrûg, &c. Inclosure Act 1806	46 Geo. 3. c. 36 Pr.	13 June 1806
An act for inclosing lands in the parishes of Llanrûg and Llanbeblig, in the county of Carnarvon.
Great Thurlow Inclosure Act 1806	46 Geo. 3. c. 37 Pr.	13 June 1806
An act for inclosing lands in the parish of Great Thurlow, in the county of Suffolk.
Lidgemoor Common Inclosure Act 1806 or the King's Pyon Inclosure Act 1806	46 Geo. 3. c. 38 Pr.	13 June 1806
An act for inclosing Lidgemoor common, in the parish of King's-Pyon, in the county of Hereford.
Wick, &c. Inclosure Act 1806	46 Geo. 3. c. 39 Pr.	13 June 1806
An act for inclosing lands in the hamlet or chapelry of Wick-juxta-Pershore, with Wike-Burnel, and Wyke-Waryn, all in the parish of Saint Andrew in Pershore, in the county of Worcester.
Earl of Abergavenny's Estate Act 1806	46 Geo. 3. c. 40 Pr.	20 June 1806
An act for enabling Henry earl of Abergavenny to grant a new lease of certain entailed mines and hereditaments in the county of Monmouth.
Easton Inclosure Act 1806	46 Geo. 3. c. 41 Pr.	20 June 1806
An act for inclosing lands in the parish of Easton, in the county of Lincoln.
Kilnwick Inclosure Act 1806	46 Geo. 3. c. 42 Pr.	20 June 1806
An act for inclosing lands in the parish of Kilnwick, in the east-riding of the county of York.
Skelton Inclosure Act 1806	46 Geo. 3. c. 43 Pr.	20 June 1806
An act for inclosing lands in the township of Skelton, in the parishes of Skelton and Overton, in the north-riding of the county of York.
Aldeby Inclosure Act 1806	46 Geo. 3. c. 44 Pr.	20 June 1806
An act for inclosing lands in the parish of Aldeby, in the county of Norfolk.
Ashley Inclosure Act 1806	46 Geo. 3. c. 45 Pr.	20 June 1806
An act for inclosing lands in the parish of Ashley, in the county of Northampton.
Tynemouth Inclosure Act 1806	46 Geo. 3. c. 46 Pr.	20 June 1806
An act for amending and rendering more effectual an act, passed in the twenty-eighth year of his present Majesty, (Note: Tynemouth Inclosure Act 1788 (28 Geo. 3. c. 47 Pr.)) for inclosing lands in the manor of Tynemouth, otherwise Tynemouthshire, otherwise Tynemouth with Tynemouthshire, in the county of Northumberland.
Weasenham, &c. Inclosure Act 1806	46 Geo. 3. c. 47 Pr.	20 June 1806
An act for allotting lands in the parishes of Weasenham All Saints, Weasenham Saint Peter, and Wellingham, in the county of Norfolk.
Dullingham Inclosure Act 1806	46 Geo. 3. c. 48 Pr.	20 June 1806
An act for inclosing lands in the parish of Dullingham, in the county of Cambridge.
Crowle Inclosure Act 1806	46 Geo. 3. c. 49 Pr.	20 June 1806
An act for inclosing lands in the parish of Crowle, in the county of Worcester.
Kirk Sandall Inclosure Act 1806	46 Geo. 3. c. 50 Pr.	3 July 1806
An act for inclosing lands in the township of Kirk-Sandall, in the west-riding of the county of York.
Gwyddelfynydd Inclosure Act 1806	46 Geo. 3. c. 51 Pr.	3 July 1806
An act for inclosing lands in the township of Gwyddelfynydd, in the parish of Towyn, in the county of Merioneth.
Beeston Inclosure Act 1806	46 Geo. 3. c. 52 Pr.	3 July 1806
An act for inclosing lands in the parish of Beeston, in the county of Nottingham.
Cottered Inclosure Act 1806	46 Geo. 3. c. 53 Pr.	3 July 1806
An act for inclosing lands in the parish of Cottered, in the county of Hertford.
Polesworth, &c. Inclosure Act 1806	46 Geo. 3. c. 54 Pr.	3 July 1806
An act for inclosing lands in the manors or parishes of Polesworth and Grendon, in the county of Warwick.
Ellesmere Inclosure and Drainage Act 1806	46 Geo. 3. c. 55 Pr.	3 July 1806
An act for inclosing lands in the parishes of Ellesmere and Saint Martin, in the county of Salop.
Fulbourn Inclosure Act 1806	46 Geo. 3. c. 56 Pr.	3 July 1806
An act for inclosing lands in the township of Fulbourn, in the county of Cambridge.
Tarpoley and Rushton Inclosure Act 1806	46 Geo. 3. c. 57 Pr.	3 July 1806
An act for inclosing lands in the townships of Tarporley, Eaton, Utkinton, and Rushton, in the parish of Tarporley, in the county palatine of Chester.
East Kirkby Inclosure Act 1806	46 Geo. 3. c. 58 Pr.	3 July 1806
An act for inclosing lands in the parish of East-Kirkby, in the county of Lincoln.
Knightley, &c. Inclosure Act 1806	46 Geo. 3. c. 59 Pr.	3 July 1806
An act for inclosing lands in the manors of Knightley and Mill-meece, and in or adjoining the manor of Standon, otherwise Stawn, in the county of Stafford.
Norton Inclosure Act 1806	46 Geo. 3. c. 60 Pr.	3 July 1806
An act for inclosing lands in the parish of Norton, in the county of Gloucester.
Cherry Hinton Inclosure Act 1806	46 Geo. 3. c. 61 Pr.	3 July 1806
An act for inclosing lands in the parish of Hinton, commonly called Cherry-Hinton, in the county of Cambridge.
Kirtling, &c. Inclosure Act 1806	46 Geo. 3. c. 62 Pr.	3 July 1806
An act for inclosing lands within the manors of Kirtling and Ashley-cum-Silverley, in the county of Cambridge.
Great Somerford Inclosure Act 1806	46 Geo. 3. c. 63 Pr.	3 July 1806
An act for inclosing lands in the parish of Great-Somerford, otherwise Broad-Somerford, in the county of Wilts.
Renard's, &c. Naturalization Act 1806	46 Geo. 3. c. 64 Pr.	3 July 1806
An act for naturalizing Francis Michael Remi Renard, and Augustus Hipolite Joseph Deroubaix.
Ampleforth Inclosure Act 1806	46 Geo. 3. c. 65 Pr.	12 July 1806
An act for amending an act, passed in the forty-fourth year of his present Majesty, (Note: Ampleforth Inclosure Act 1804 (44 Geo. 3. c. 58 Pr.)) for inclosing lands within the township or townships of Ampleforth, in the parishes of Ampleforth and Oswaldkirk, in the county of York.
Saunderton Inclosure Act 1806	46 Geo. 3. c. 66 Pr.	12 July 1806
An act for inclosing lands in the parish of Saunderton, in the county of Buckingham.
Dodworth Inclosure Act 1806	46 Geo. 3. c. 67 Pr.	12 July 1806
An act for inclosing lands in the township of Dodworth, in the parish of Silkstone, in the west-riding of the county of York.
Higham Inclosure Act 1806	46 Geo. 3. c. 68 Pr.	12 July 1806
An act for confirming and establishing an ancient division and inclosure of the common fields in the township of Higham, and for making compensation for the tythes of the lands in the parish of Higham, in the county of Leicester.
Kirkdale, &c. Inclosure Act 1806	46 Geo. 3. c. 69 Pr.	12 July 1806
An act for inclosing lands in the parishes of Kirkdale and Helmsley, in the north-riding of the county of York.
Tunstal Inclosure Act 1806	46 Geo. 3. c. 70 Pr.	12 July 1806
An act for inclosing lands in the manor of Tunstal and parish of Catterick, in the county of York.
Kelfield Inclosure Act 1806	46 Geo. 3. c. 71 Pr.	12 July 1806
An act for inclosing lands in the township of Kelfield, in the east-riding of the county of York.
Muller's Naturalization Act 1806	46 Geo. 3. c. 72 Pr.	12 July 1806
An act for naturalizing Frederick Rodolphus Muller.
Deeping Inclosure Act 1806	46 Geo. 3. c. 73 Pr.	16 July 1806
An act for inclosing lands in the parishes of Market-Deeping and Deeping Saint James. in the county of Lincoln; and for altering and repealing an act, passed in the forty-first year of his present Majesty, (Note: Kesteven and Holland Inclosures and Drainage Act 1801 (41 Geo. 3. (U.K.) c.cxxviii)) for draining, dividing, allotting, and inclosing, Deeping, Langtoft, Baston, Spalding, Pinchbeck, and Cowbit commons, within the parts of Kesteven and Holland, in the county of Lincoln; and for other purposes in the said act mentioned, so far as the same relates to the division of the said commons.
Kingston Bagpuize Inclosure Act 1806	46 Geo. 3. c. 74 Pr.	16 July 1806
An act for inclosing lands in the parish of Kingston Bagpuize, in the county of Berks.
Gordon's Divorce Act 1806	46 Geo. 3. c. 75 Pr.	16 July 1806
An act to dissolve the marriage of Sir John Gordon, baronet, with Pyne Crosby, his now wife, and to enable him to again, and for other purposes therein mentioned.
Von Essen's Naturalization Act 1806	46 Geo. 3. c. 76 Pr.	16 July 1806
An act for naturalizing Peter Von Essen.
D'Ozy's Naturalization Act 1806	46 Geo. 3. c. 77 Pr.	16 July 1806
An act for naturalizing Roelof Jacobus D'Ozy.
Simpson's Divorce Act 1806	46 Geo. 3. c. 78 Pr.	21 July 1806
An act to dissolve the marriage of William Simpson, esquire, with Sarah Barbara Torriano, his now wife, and to enable him to marry again; and for other purposes therein mentioned.
Bakewell Inclosure Act 1806	46 Geo. 3. c. 79 Pr.	22 July 1806
An act for inclosing lands in the manors and townships of Bakewell and Over-Haddon, in the parish of Bakewell, in the county of Derby.

=== Sources ===
- Pickering, Danby, ed. (1807). The Statutes at Large. Vol. 46: Anno Quadragesimo Sexto Georgii III. Regis. Being the Fourth Session of the Second Parliament of the United Kingdom of Great-Britain and Ireland. Cambridge: Cambridge University Press – via Google Books.
- The Statutes of the United Kingdom of Great Britain and Ireland. Vol. 3: Containing the Acts 45 Geo. III. (1805) and 46 Geo. III. (1806). London: Eyre and Strahan. 1823 – via Google Books.
- Journal of the House of Commons. Vol. 61. London: His Majesty's Stationery Office. pp. 3–569 – via Google Books.
- Chronological Table of and Index to the Statutes. Vol. 1: To the End of the Session 59 Vict. Sess. 2 (1895) (13th ed.). London: Her Majesty's Stationery Office. 1896. pp. 183–185 – via Google Books.
- "Statutes of the United Kingdom of Great Britain and Ireland, 1806". Irish Statute Book. Office of the Attorney General, Government of Ireland.

== See also ==
- List of acts of the Parliament of the United Kingdom
