= Evidence Act 1950 =

Malaysian legislation

Federal Legislative Council of the Federation of Malaya
- Long title: An Act to define the law of evidence.
- Citation: Act 56 (Originally enacted as Ordinance No. 11 of 1950, revised as Act 56 with effect from 1 November 1971)
- Territorial extent: Throughout Malaysia
- Passed by: Federal Legislative Council
- Passed: 20 April 1950
- Assented to: 12 May 1950 (High Commissioner for Malaya)
- Royal assent: 6 May 1950 (Rulers of the Malay States)
- Effective: 23 May 1950 – Peninsular Malaysia, Ord. No. 11 of 1950; 1 November 1971 – Sabah and Sarawak, P.U.(A) 261/1971

Repeals
- The Evidence Enactment [F.M.S. Cap. 10] Enactment No. 33 (Evidence) [Kedah Enact. No. 33] The Evidence Enactment, 1930 [Kelantan Enact. No. 8 of 1930] The Evidence Enactment, 1354 [Perlis Enact. No. 13 of 1354] The Evidence Enactment, 1355 [Trengganu Enact. No. 11 of 1355] The Evidence Ordinance [S.S. Cap. 13] The Johore (Replacement of Laws) Ordinance, 1949 [F. of M. Ord. No. 9 of 1949] (The words "F.M.S. Cap. 10 ... Evidence Enactment" in the Schedule); Evidence Ordinance of Sabah [Sabah Cap. 43] Evidence Ordinance of Sarawak [Swk. Cap. 54] (except section 92 and sections 170 to 180)

Amended by
- Federal Constitution (Modification of Laws) (Ordinances and Proclamations) Order 1958 [L.N. 332/1958] Evidence Ordinance (Extension) Order 1971 [P.U.(A) 261/1971] Corrigendum to P.U.(A) 261/1971 [P.U.(A) 280/1971] Revision of Laws (Evidence Act) Order 1974 [P.U.(A) 239/1974] Criminal Procedure Code (Amendment and Extension) Act 1976 [Act A324] Constitution (Amendment) Act 1976 [Act A354] Subordinate Courts Act (Extension) Order 1980 [P.U.(A) 357/1980] Evidence (Amendment) Act 1989 [Act A729] Evidence (Amendment) Act 1993 [Act A851] Evidence (Amendment) Act 1997 [Act A978]
- Status: In force

The Evidence Act 1950 (Malay: Akta Keterangan 1950), is Malaysian legislation, which was enacted to define the law of evidence.

== Structure ==
The Evidence Act 1950, in its current form (1 January 2006), consists of 3 Parts containing 11 chapters, 167 sections and no schedule (including 9 amendments).

- Part I: Relevancy
  - Chapter I: Preliminary
  - Chapter II: Relevancy of Facts
    - General
    - Admissions and Confessions
    - Statements by Persons who cannot be called as Witnesses
    - Statements made under Special Circumstances
    - How much of a Statement to be proved
    - Judgments of Courts when relevant
    - Opinions of Third Persons when relevant
    - Character when relevant
- Part II: Proof
  - Chapter III: Facts which need not be proved
  - Chapter IV: Oral Evidence
  - Chapter V: Documentary Evidence
    - Public Documents
    - Presumptions as to Documents
    - Documents Produced by a Computer
  - Chapter VI: Exclusion of Oral by Documentary Evidence
- Part III: Production and Effect of Evidence
  - Chapter VII: Burden of Proof
  - Chapter VIII: Estoppel
  - Chapter IX: Witnesses
  - Chapter X: Examination of Witnesses
  - Chapter XI: Improper Admission and Rejection of Evidence

== See also ==
- Evidence Act
