= Witnesses Act 1806 =

Act of the Parliament of the United Kingdom

Witnesses Act 1806 (Note: The citation of this act by this short title was authorised by section 1 of, and the first schedule to, the Short Titles Act 1896. Due to the repeal of those provisions it is now authorised by section 19(2) of the Interpretation Act 1978.)
- Act of Parliament
- Parliament of the United Kingdom
- Long title: An Act to declare the Law with respect to Witnesses refusing to answer.
- Citation: 46 Geo. 3. c. 37
- Territorial extent: United Kingdom

Dates
- Royal assent: 5 May 1806
- Commencement: 5 May 1806 (Note: The Acts of Parliament (Commencement) Act 1793.)

Status: Current legislation

Text of statute as originally enacted

Revised text of statute as amended

Text of the Witnesses Act 1806 as in force today (including any amendments) within the United Kingdom, from legislation.gov.uk.

The Witnesses Act 1806 (46 Geo. 3. c. 37) is an act of the Parliament of the United Kingdom which prohibits a witness from refusing to answer a question solely on the ground that the answer may establish that he owes a debt or is liable to civil suit (but would not incriminate him). It is still in force.
