= Public Notaries Act 1801 =

Act of the Parliament of the United Kingdom

Public Notaries Act 1801 (Note: The citation of this act by this short title was authorised by section 1 of, and the first schedule to, the Short Titles Act 1896. Due to the repeal of those provisions it is now authorised by section 19(2) of the Interpretation Act 1978.)
- Act of Parliament
- Parliament of the United Kingdom
- Long title: An Act for the better Regulation of Publick Notaries in England.
- Citation: 41 Geo. 3. (U. K.) c. 79
- Territorial extent: United Kingdom

Dates
- Royal assent: 27 June 1801
- Commencement: 27 June 1801 (Note: The Acts of Parliament (Commencement) Act 1793.)
Other legislation
Amended by	Statute Law Revision Act 1872; Statute Law Revision Act 1887; Public Authorities Protection Act 1893; Administration of Justice Act 1965; Statute Law Revision Act 1888; Courts and Legal Services Act 1990; Statute Law (Repeals) Act 1993; Legal Services Act 2007

Status: Partially repealed

Text of statute as originally enacted

Revised text of statute as amended

Text of the Public Notaries Act 1801 as in force today (including any amendments) within the United Kingdom, from legislation.gov.uk.

The Public Notaries Act 1801 (41 Geo. 3. (U.K.) c. 79) is an act of the Parliament of the United Kingdom that banned people from acting as public notaries without lawful authority from a court. From 1 August 1801, no person was permitted to be a public notary "unless such person shall have been duly sworn, admitted, and inrolled [sic]". It did not, however, apply to public notaries who worked within religious organisations. It required notaries to serve as an apprentice for seven years prior to appointment, and provided detailed penalties for dishonesty with regard to appointments and qualifications for the position. Several sections of the act were eventually repealed or overridden by the Courts and Legal Services Act 1990, the Legal Services Act 2007 and the Statute Law Revision Act 1872 (35 & 36 Vict. c. 63).

== Subsequent developments ==
Sections 6, 11, 12 and 15 of the act were repealed by section 1 of, and the schedule to, the Statute Law Revision Act 1872 (35 & 36 Vict. c. 63), which came into force on 6 August 1872.

Section 17 of the act was repealed by section 2 of, and the schedule to, the Public Authorities Protection Act 1893 (56 & 57 Vict. c. 61), which came into force on 1 January 1894.

Section 16 of the act was repealed by section 1(1) of, and group 1 of part I of schedule 1 to, the Statute Law (Repeals) Act 1993, which came into force on 5 November 1993.
