= Additional Forces Acts 1803 =

Created the Army of Reserve for the defence of England

Defence of the Realm (England) Act 1803
- Act of Parliament
- Parliament of the United Kingdom
- Long title: An Act to enable his Majesty more effectually to raise and assemble in England an additional Military Force for the better Defence and Security of the United Kingdom and for the more vigorous Prosecution of the War.
- Citation: 43 Geo. 3. c. 82
- Territorial extent: United Kingdom

Dates
- Royal assent: 6 July 1803
- Commencement: 6 July 1803 (Note: The Acts of Parliament (Commencement) Act 1793.)
- Repealed: 6 August 1872
Other legislation
Repealed by	Statute Law Revision Act 1872
Relates to	Defence of the Realm (Scotland) Act 1803; Defence of the Realm (Ireland) Act 1803

Status: Repealed

Text of statute as originally enacted

Defence of the Realm (Scotland) Act 1803
- Act of Parliament
- Parliament of the United Kingdom
- Long title: An Act to enable his Majesty more effectually to raise and assemble an additional Military Force in Scotland for the better Defence and Security of the United Kingdom and for the more vigorous Prosecution of the War.
- Citation: 43 Geo. 3. c. 83
- Territorial extent: United Kingdom

Dates
- Royal assent: 6 July 1803
- Commencement: 6 July 1803
- Repealed: 6 August 1872
Other legislation
Amended by	Defence of the Realm Act 1806
Repealed by	Statute Law Revision Act 1872
Relates to	Defence of the Realm (England) Act 1803; Defence of the Realm (Ireland) Act 1803

Status: Repealed

Text of statute as originally enacted

Defence of the Realm (Ireland) Act 1803
- Act of Parliament
- Parliament of the United Kingdom
- Long title: An Act to enable his Majesty more effectually to raise and assemble in Ireland an additional Military Force for the better Defence and Security of the United Kingdom and for the vigorous Prosecution of the War.
- Citation: 43 Geo. 3. c. 85
- Territorial extent: United Kingdom

Dates
- Royal assent: 11 July 1803
- Commencement: 11 July 1803
- Repealed: 6 August 1872
Other legislation
Repealed by	Statute Law Revision Act 1872
Relates to	Defence of the Realm (Scotland) Act 1803; Defence of the Realm (England) Act 1803

Status: Repealed

Text of statute as originally enacted

A set of three Additional Forces Acts of July 1803 created an Army of Reserve for the defence of the United Kingdom of Great Britain and Ireland against the imminent threat of sea-borne invasion by Napoleon's French Revolutionary Army. A total of 15,780 men were added to the country's armed forces by these compulsory measures, creating an "Army of Reserve".

The acts – one each for England (43 Geo. 3. c. 82), Scotland (c. 83) and Ireland (c. 85) – were passed by William Pitt the Younger despite strong political opposition.

== Subsequent developments ==
The whole of the three acts were repealed by section 1 of, and the schedule to, the Statute Law Revision Act 1872 (35 & 36 Vict. c. 63), which came into force on 6 August 1872.

== See also ==
- List of British fencible regiments
