= Statute Law Revision Act 1872 =

Act of the Parliament of the United Kingdom

Statute Law Revision Act 1872 (Note: Section 3.)
- Act of Parliament
- Parliament of the United Kingdom
- Long title: An Act for further promoting the Revision of the Statute Law by repealing certain Enactments which have ceased to be in force or have become unnecessary.
- Citation: 35 & 36 Vict. c. 63
- Introduced by: John Coleridge MP (Commons); William Wood, 1st Baron Hatherley (Lords)
- Territorial extent: United Kingdom

Dates
- Royal assent: 6 August 1872
- Commencement: 6 August 1872 (Note: The Acts of Parliament (Commencement) Act 1793.)
Other legislation
| Amends | Statute Law Revision Act 1871; See § Repealed enactments |
| Repeals/revokes | See § Repealed enactments |
| Amended by | Statute Law Revision Act 1894; Statute Law Revision (Isle of Man) Act 1991 |
| Relates to | Repeal of Obsolete Statutes Act 1856; See Statute Law Revision Act |

Status: Partially repealed

History of passage through Parliament

Records of Parliamentary debate relating to the statute from Hansard

Text of statute as originally enacted

The Statute Law Revision Act 1872 (35 & 36 Vict. c. 63) is an act of the Parliament of the United Kingdom for the United Kingdom enactments from 1772 to 1806 which had ceased to be in force or had become necessary. The act was intended, in particular, to facilitate the preparation of the revised edition of the statutes, then in progress.

== Background ==
In the United Kingdom, acts of Parliament remain in force until expressly repealed. Blackstone's Commentaries on the Laws of England, published in the late 18th-century, raised questions about the system and structure of the common law and the poor drafting and disorder of the existing statute book.

From 1810 to 1825, The Statutes of the Realm was published, providing the first authoritative collection of acts. The first statute law revision act was not passed until 1856 with the Repeal of Obsolete Statutes Act 1856 (19 & 20 Vict. c. 64). This approach — focusing on removing obsolete laws from the statute book followed by consolidation — was proposed by Peter Locke King MP, who had been highly critical of previous commissions' approaches, expenditures, and lack of results.

Previous statute law revision acts
| Year passed | Title | Citation | Effect |
|---|---|---|---|
| 1861 | Statute Law Revision Act 1861 | 24 & 25 Vict. c. 101 | Repealed or amended over 800 enactments |
| 1863 | Statute Law Revision Act 1863 | 26 & 27 Vict. c. 125 | Repealed or amended over 1,600 enactments for England and Wales |
| 1867 | Statute Law Revision Act 1867 | 30 & 31 Vict. c. 59 | Repealed or amended over 1,380 enactments |
| 1870 | Statute Law Revision Act 1870 | 33 & 34 Vict. c. 69 | Repealed or amended over 250 enactments |
| 1871 | Promissory Oaths Act 1871 | 34 & 35 Vict. c. 48 | Repealed or amended almost 200 enactments |
| 1871 | Statute Law Revision Act 1871 | 34 & 35 Vict. c. 116 | Repealed or amended over 1,060 enactments |

== Passage ==
The Statute Law Revision Bill had its first reading in the House of Lords on 13 May 1872, introduced by the Lord Chancellor, William Wood, 1st Baron Hatherley. The bill had its second reading in the House of Lords on 3 June 1872 and was committed to a committee of the whole house. Robert Gascoyne-Cecil, 3rd Marquess of Salisbury, expressed concern relating to a specific act relating to age requirements for ordination in the Church of England that could lead to unintended consequences. In response, the Lord Chancellor assured that this would be reviewed. The committee met on 10 June 1872, and reported on 10 June 1872, without amendments. The bill had its third reading in the House of Lords on 13 June 1871 and passed, without amendments

The bill had its first reading in the House of Commons on 11 July 1872, introduced by the Attorney General, John Coleridge, 1st Baron Coleridge, second reading in the House of Commons on 19 July 1872 and was committed to a committee of the whole house, (Note: Hansard incorrectly specifies this as the Statute Law Revision (No. 2) Bill [283].) which reported on 25 July 1872. (Note: Hansard incorrectly specifies this as the Statute Law Revision (No. 2) Bill [283].) The amended bill was considered on 26 July 1872, (Note: Hansard incorrectly specifies this as the Statute Law Revision (No. 2) Bill [283].) and the Bill had its third reading in the House of Commons on 29 July 1872 and passed, without amendments.

The bill was granted royal assent on 6 August 1872. (Note: Hansard incorrectly specifies this as the Statute Law Revision (No. 2) Bill [283].)

== Subsequent developments ==
The act was intended, in particular, to facilitate the preparation of a revised edition of the statutes.

The act was partly in force in Great Britain at the end of 2010.

Section 2 of, and the schedule to, the act were repealed by section 1 of, and the first schedule to, the Statute Law Revision Act 1894 (57 & 58 Vict. c. 54), which came into force on 25 August 1894.

The enactments which were repealed (whether for the whole or any part of the United Kingdom) by the act were repealed so far as they extended to the Isle of Man by section 1(1) of, and schedule 1 to, the Statute Law Revision (Isle of Man) Act 1991, which came into force on 25 July 1991.

The act was retained for the Republic of Ireland by section 2(2)(a) of, and part 4 of schedule 1 to, the Statute Law Revision Act 2007, which came into force on 8 May 2007.

== Repealed enactments ==
Section 1 of the act repealed 489 enactments, listed in the schedule to the act, across six categories: (Note: The Note of the bill, unlike the schedule, gives commentary on each act, noting any earlier repeals and the reason for the new repeal.)

- Expired
- Spent
- Repealed in general terms
- Virtually repealed
- Superseded
- Obsolete

Section 1 of the act included several safeguards to ensure that the repeal does not negatively affect existing rights or ongoing legal matters. Specifically, any legal rights, privileges, or remedies already obtained under the repealed laws, as well as any legal proceedings or principles established by them, remain unaffected. Section 1 of the act also ensured that repealed enactments that have been incorporated into other laws would continue to have legal effect in those contexts. Moreover, the repeal would not revive any former rights, offices, or jurisdictions that had already been abolished.

Section 2 of the act amended the explanatory note of the schedule to the Statute Law Revision Act 1871 (34 & 35 Vict. c. 116) to correct the drafting by providing that the explanatory note of the schedule to this act shall be read as if the words "Edward the Third" were inserted immediately before the words "William the Third".

| Citation | Short title | Title | Extent of repeal |
|---|---|---|---|
| 13 Geo. 3. c. 31 | Criminal Law Act 1772 | An Act for the more effectual Execution of the Criminal Laws in the Two Parts of the United Kingdom | The whole act. |
| 14 Geo. 3. c. 83 | British North America (Quebec) Act 1774 | An Act for making more effectual Provision for the Government of the Province of Quebec, in North America | Sections Three, Four, Six, and Seven. Section Eleven from "subject" to end of that Section. Sections Twelve to Seventeen. Repealed as to all Her Majesty's Dominions. |
| 14 Geo. 3. c. 88 | Quebec Finance Act 1774 | An Act to establish a Fund towards further defraying the Charges of the Administration of Justice and Support of the Civil Government within the Province of Quebec, in America | Except Section Five. Repealed as to all Her Majesty's Dominions. |
| 21 Geo. 3. c. 65 | East India Company Act 1781 | An Act the title of which begins with the words,—An Act for establishing an Agreement with the United Company,—and ends with the words,—as well in India as in Europe, and the recruiting the Military Forces of the said Company. | Repealed as to all Her Majesty's Dominions. |
| 21 Geo. 3. c. 70 | East India Company Act 1780 | An Act the title of which begins with the words,—An Act to explain and amend so much of an Act, made in the Thirteenth Year,—and ends with the words,—Resistance made to the Process of the Supreme Court | Sections Twenty-seven and Twenty-eight. Repealed as to all Her Majesty's Dominions. |
| 22 Geo. 3. c. 82 | Civil List and Secret Service Money Act 1782 | An Act the title of which begins with the words,—An Act for enabling His Majesty to discharge the Debt contracted,—and ends with the words,—Revenues of the Civil List | Sections Four, Fourteen, Sixteen, Seventeen, Nineteen to Twenty-three, Thirty-one to Thirty-six and Thirty-eight to Forty-one. |
| 23 Geo. 3. c. 36 | East India Company Act 1783 | An Act the title of which begins with the words,—An Act to discharge and indemnify the United Company of Merchants of England trading to the East Indies,—and ends with the words,—One thousand seven hundred and eighty-three. | Repealed as to all Her Majesty's Dominions. |
| 24 Geo. 3. Sess. 2. c. 25 | East India Company Act 1784 | An Act for the better Regulation and Management of the Affairs of the East India Company, and of the British Possessions in India; and for establishing a Court of Judicature for the more speedy and effectual Trial of Persons accused of Offences committed in the East Indies | Sections One to Sixty-three. Repealed as to all Her Majesty's Dominions. |
| 25 Geo. 3. c. 70 | Duties on Servants (No. 2) Act 1785 | An Act to rectify a Mistake in an Act, passed in this present Session of Parliament, intituled, An Act to repeal the Duties on Male Servants; and for granting New Duties on Male and Female Servants. | The whole act. |
| 25 Geo. 3. c. 84 | Parliamentary Elections Act 1785 | An Act the title of which begins with the words,—An Act to limit the Duration of Polls and Scrutinies,—and ends with the words,—want of Returns being made of Members to serve in Parliament | Section One from "but so as that no Poll" to "same Day" and from "unless the" to end of that Section. Sections Two, Five, Six, Nine to Twelve, Fourteen and Sixteen. |
| 26 Geo. 3. c. 57 | East India Company Act 1786 | An Act the title of which begins with the words,—An Act for the further Regulation of the Trial of Persons,—and ends with the words,—Deeds and Writings executed in Great Britain or India. | Sections Thirty-one, Thirty-six and Thirty-seven. Repealed as to all Her Majesty's Dominions. |
| 26 Geo. 3. c. 81 | Fisheries (No. 2) Act 1786 | An Act for the more effectual Encouragement of the British Fisheries. | The whole act. |
| 28 Geo. 3. c. 8 | East India Company Act 1788 | An Act the title of which begins with the words,—An Act for removing any Doubt respecting the Power of the Commissioners for the Affairs of India,—and ends with the words,—Revenues therein mentioned. | Repealed as to all Her Majesty's Dominions. |
| 31 Geo. 3. c. 31 | Clergy Endowments (Canada) Act 1791 | An Act the title of which begins with the words,—An Act to repeal certain Parts of an Act, passed in the fourteenth Year of His Majesty's Reign, intituled, An Act for making more effectual Provision for the Government of the said Province | Except Sections Thirty-eight to Forty and Forty-Three to Forty-five. Repealed as to all Her Majesty's Dominions. |
| 32 Geo. 3. c. 63 | Scottish Episcopalians Relief Act 1792 | An Act for granting Relief to Pastors, Ministers, and Lay Persons of the Episcopal Communion in Scotland | Section One. |
| 33 Geo. 3. c. 52 | East India Company Act 1793 | An Act the title of which begins with the words,—An Act for continuing in the East India Company,—and ends with the words,—Government of the Towns of Calcutta, Madras, and Bombay | Sections Seventy-one to One hundred and thirty-six, One hundred and thirty-eight, One hundred and thirty-nine and One hundred and forty-two to One hundred and fifty. Repealed as to all Her Majesty's Dominions. |
| 34 Geo. 3. c. 73 | Oaths at Parliamentary Elections Act 1794 | An Act for directing the Appointment of Commissioners, to administer certain Oaths and Declarations required by Law to be taken and made by Persons offering to vote at the Election of Members to serve in Parliament | The whole act. |
| 36 Geo. 3. c. 52 | Legacy Duty Act 1796 | An Act for repealing certain Duties on Legacies and Shares of Personal Estates, and for granting other Duties thereon, in certain cases | Sections One to Three, Seven, Thirty-six and Thirty-two. |
| 37 Geo. 3. c. 25 | Militia (Tower Hamlets) Act 1796 | An Act for the better raising and ordering the Militia Forces of the Tower Hamlets, in the County of Middlesex | Section Three from "the Names" to end of that Section. Section Eleven from "and every Deputy Lieutenant" to end of that Section. Section Twelve, the words "Colonels, Lieutenant Colonels, or Majors," and from "and if any Person" to "fifty Pounds". |
| 37 Geo. 3. c. 31 | East India Company Act 1797 | An Act to enable the East India Company to raise Money by further increasing their Capital Stock, and to extend the Provisions now existing respecting the present Stock of the Company to the said increased Stock. | The whole act. |
| 38 Geo. 3. c. 5 | Land Tax Act 1797 | An Act for granting an Aid to His Majesty by a Land Tax, to be raised in Great Britain, for the Service of the Year One thousand seven hundred and ninety-eight | Section Three. Section Four from "for and upon the said Offices" to "aforesaid, and". Section Eight from "upon all ready Money" to "to this Act, and" and from "and the said Commissioners are hereby required" to end of that Section. Section Nine from "and are hereby" to end of that Section. Sections Ten to Twelve. Section Thirteen from "which said Receivers General" to end of that Section. Sections Twenty, Thirty-two, Thirty-three, Fifty-one and Fifty-two. Section Fifty-three from "where any Person" to "shall be a and". Section Fifty-four. Section Fifty-seven so far as it relates to salaries or pensions. Sections Sixty-two to Sixty-five, Sixty-nine, Seventy-two, Seventy-three, Eighty-one, Eighty-two, Eighty-five, One hundred to One hundred and four, One hundred and eight and One hundred and nine. Section One hundred and eleven so far as it relates to distresses in pursuance of any former Act. Sections One hundred and twelve, One hundred and thirteen, One hundred and fifteen to One hundred and nineteen and One hundred and twenty-one to One hundred and twenty-seven. Section One hundred and thirty-one to "respectively; and". |
| 38 Geo. 3. c. 48 | Land Tax Commissioners Act 1798 | An Act to alter and amend so much of an Act, passed in this present Session of Parliament, intituled An Act for granting an Aid to His Majesty by a Land Tax, to be raised in Great Britain, for the service of the Year One thousand seven hundred and ninety-eight, as relates to the Qualification of Commissioners | Section Two. |
| 39 & 40 Geo. 3. c. 81 | Hop Trade Act 1800 | An Act to repeal an Act, made in the Fourteenth Year of the Reign of His present Majesty, intituled An Act to prevent Frauds in the buying and selling of Hops; and for the better Collection of the Duty on Hops; and to prevent Frauds and Abuses in the Trade of Hops | Except Section Three. |
| 41 Geo. 3. (U.K.) c. 1 | Use of Fine Flour Act 1801 | An Act the title of which begins with the words,—An Act to suspend, until the Twenty-fifth day of March,—and ends with the words,—Flour or such other Grain than is prescribed by the said Act. | The whole act. |
| 41 Geo. 3. (U.K.) c. 2 | Use of Fine Flour (No. 2) Act 1801 | An Act the title of which begins with the words,—An Act to repeal an Act made in the last Session,—and ends with the words,—Flour of a finer Description than allowed by the said Act. | The whole act. |
| 41 Geo. 3. (U.K.) c. 4 | Unfunded Debt Act 1801 | An Act to enable the Lords Commissioners of His Majesty's Treasury to issue Exchequer Bills, on the Credit of such Aids or Supplies as have been or shall be granted by Parliament, for the Service of the Year One thousand eight hundred and one. | The whole act. |
| 41 Geo. 3. (U.K.) c. 5 | Annuity to Sir Sidney Smith Act 1801 | An Act to enable His Majesty to grant a certain Annuity to Lieutenant General Sir Ralph Abercromby, Knight of the Bath, late Commander in Chief of His Majesty's Forces employed on the Coast of Egypt. | The whole act. |
| 41 Geo. 3. (U.K.) c. 11 | Mutiny Act 1801 | An Act for punishing Mutiny and Desertion; and for the better Payment of the Army and their Quarters. | The whole act. |
| 41 Geo. 3. (U.K.) c. 13 | Bounties Act 1801 | An Act for continuing the Bounties granted by an Act of the last Session of Parliament, on Flour imported from America, in Ships which shall have cleared out between certain Periods. | The whole act. |
| 41 Geo. 3. (U.K.) c. 14 | Suppression of Rebellion (Ireland) Act 1801 | An Act the title of which begins with the words,—An Act for amending and further continuing, until the Twenty-fourth Day of June,—and ends with the words,—Properties of His Majesty's faithful Subjects within the same. | The whole act. |
| 41 Geo. 3. (U.K.) c. 15 | Habeas Corpus Suspension (Ireland) Act 1801 | An Act the title of which begins with the words,—An Act to continue, until the Twenty-fourth Day of June,—and ends with the words,—conspiring against His Majesty's Person and Government. | The whole act. |
| 41 Geo. 3. (U.K.) c. 16 | Malting etc. from Grain Act 1801 | An Act to prohibit, until the Twenty-fifth Day of March One thousand eight hundred and two, the making of Malt and the distilling of Spirits from Corn or Grain in Ireland. | The whole act. |
| 41 Geo. 3. (U.K.) c. 17 | Duties Continuance Act 1801 | An Act for continuing, until the Twenty-fifth Day of March One thousand eight hundred and two, certain Acts of the last Session of the Parliament of Ireland, for granting Duties to His Majesty. | The whole act. |
| 41 Geo. 3. (U.K.) c. 18 | Marine Mutiny Act 1801 | An Act for the Regulation of His Majesty's Marine Forces while on Shore, until the Twenty-fifth Day of March One thousand eight hundred and two. | The whole act. |
| 41 Geo. 3. (U.K.) c. 19 | Merchant Shipping Act 1801 | An Act the title of which begins with the words,—An Act for reviving and continuing, until the First Day of October,—and ends with the words,—obstructing Seamen and others from pursuing their lawful Occupations. | The whole act. |
| 41 Geo. 3. (U.K.) c. 20 | Improvement of Commons Act 1801 | An Act the title of which begins with the words,—An Act to extend, until the Twenty-ninth Day of September,—and ends with the words,—Cultivation of Potatoes in Open and Common Field Lands. | The whole act. |
| 41 Geo. 3. (U.K.) c. 22 | Apprenticeship Indentures Act 1801 | An Act to render valid Indentures of Apprenticeship of Poor Children and others, made upon improper Stamps, upon certain Conditions; and to indemnify all Persons who may have incurred Penalties thereby. | The whole act. |
| 41 Geo. 3. (U.K.) c. 23 | Poor Rate Act 1801 | An Act for the better Collection of Rates made for the Relief of the Poor | Section Nine. |
| 41 Geo. 3. (U.K.) c. 25 | Master of the Rolls (Ireland) Act 1801 | An Act for the better Regulation of the Office of Clerk of the Rolls, in that Part of the United Kingdom called Ireland; and for augmenting the Salary annexed to the said Office | Section One from "but subject" to "Time being;". Section Two. |
| 41 Geo. 3. (U.K.) c. 26 | Habeas Corpus Suspension Act 1801 | An Act the title of which begins with the words,—An Act for reviving and further continuing, until Six Weeks after,—and ends with the words,—conspiring against His Person and Government. | The whole act. |
| 41 Geo. 3. (U.K.) c. 27 | Lottery Act 1801 | An Act for granting to His Majesty a certain Sum of Money for the Service of Great Britain, to be raised by a Lottery. | The whole act. |
| 41 Geo. 3. (U.K.) c. 30 | Seditious Meetings Prevention Act 1801 | An Act to revive and continue, until Six Weeks after the Commencement of the next Session of Parliament, an Act, made in the Thirty-sixth Year of the Reign of His present Majesty, intituled An Act for the more effectually preventing seditious Meetings and Assemblies. | The whole act. |
| 41 Geo. 3. (U.K.) c. 31 | Steeping of Barley Act 1801 | An Act the title of which begins with the words,—An Act to revive and continue, until the Fifth Day of July,—and ends with the words,—Barley damaged by Rain in the last Harvest. | The whole act. |
| 41 Geo. 3. (U.K.) c. 32 | Irish Charges Act 1801 | An Act for granting to His Majesty several Sums of Money for defraying the Charge of certain permanent Services in that Part of the United Kingdom called Ireland | The first, second, third, fifth, sixth, eighth, ninth, eleventh, twelfth, sixteenth, twenty-first, twenty-second, twenty-third, twenty-fourth, thirtieth and thirty-second Items in Section One. Section Three to "obtained in that Behalf; and". |
| 41 Geo. 3. (U.K.) c. 34 | Bounties (No. 2) Act 1801 | An Act for granting Bounties on the Importation into Ireland of Wheat, Barley, Rye, Oats, and Indian Corn, and of Barley, Oatmeal, Wheaten Flour, Indian Meal, and Wheaten Flour and Rice. | The whole act. |
| 41 Geo. 3. (U.K.) c. 35 | Quartering of Soldiers Act 1801 | An Act for encreasing the Rates of Subsistence to be paid to Innkeepers and others on quartering Soldiers. | The whole act. |
| 41 Geo. 3. (U.K.) c. 36 | Exportation, etc. Act 1801 | An Act the title of which begins with the words,—An Act for enabling the Lord Lieutenant,—and ends with the words,—Proclamations of the Lord Lieutenant and Council of Ireland. | The whole act. |
| 41 Geo. 3. (U.K.) c. 37 | Importation Act 1801 | An Act for making Provision for the Entry and Return Voyages of certain Ships which may import Sugar or Coffee from the West Indies, and to authorize the Importation of Rice or other Grain into Ireland, in Ships coming directly from the East Indies. | The whole act. |
| 41 Geo. 3. (U.K.) c. 39 | Forgery of Banknotes Act 1801 | An Act for the more effectually preventing the Forgery of Bank Notes, Bank Bills of Exchange, and Bank Post Bills. | The whole act. |
| 41 Geo. 3. (U.K.) c. 41 | Importation (No. 2) Act 1801 | An Act for allowing, until the Twentieth Day of August One thousand eight hundred and one, the Importation into Ireland of British and Foreign Hops at a like Duty as is payable in Great Britain for the same. | The whole act. |
| 41 Geo. 3. (U.K.) c. 43 | Militia Pay (England) Act 1801 | An Act for defraying the Charge of the Pay and Cloathing of the Militia in England for the year One thousand eight hundred and one. | The whole act. |
| 41 Geo. 3. (U.K.) c. 44 | Taxation Act 1801 | An Act the title of which begins with the words,—An Act for reviving, continuing until the Twentieth Day of May,—and ends with the words,— Drawbacks on Sugar exported, until the Tenth Day of May One thousand eight hundred and one. | The whole act. |
| 41 Geo. 3. (U.K.) c. 45 | Continuance of Laws Act 1801 | An Act the title of which begins with the words,—An Act to continue, until the Twenty-ninth Day of September,—and ends with the words,—granting Annuities in Manner therein provided. | The whole act. |
| 41 Geo. 3. (U.K.) c. 46 | Indemnity for Certain Acts Act 1801 | An Act to render valid all Acts done in Execution of Three several Orders of His Majesty in Council, relating to Bills of Exchange drawn by Persons in Russia, and to Freight of Russia, Swedish, and Danish Ships. | The whole act. |
| 41 Geo. 3. (U.K.) c. 47 | Crown Lands: Taxation Act 1801 | An Act to amend and continue until the Twenty-ninth Day of September One thousand eight hundred and two, an Act passed in Ireland in the Fortieth Year of the Reign of His present Majesty, intituled An Act for regulating the Trade of a Distiller, and for securing the Duties payable on Home-made Spirits. | The whole act. |
| 41 Geo. 3. (U.K.) c. 49 | Indemnity (Ireland) Act 1801 | An Act to indemnify Persons who have omitted to qualify themselves for Offices or Employments in Ireland according to Law. | The whole act. |
| 41 Geo. 3. (U.K.) c. 51 | Taxation Act 1801 | An Act to permit Portugal Wine to be landed and warehoused without Payment of Duties, under certain Restrictions, for a limited Time. | The whole act. |
| 41 Geo. 3. (U.K.) c. 52 | House of Commons (Disqualifications) Act 1801 | An Act the title of which begins with the words,—An Act for declaring what Persons shall be disabled,—and ends with the words,—Commons of the Parliament of the said United Kingdom | Section Four from "Nor any Person who shall be a Commissioner for" to "Imprest Accounts," from "or of the Auditor" to "Tellers of the Exchequer," and the words "or of the Commissioners of Appeals". Section Seven. Section Eight, the words "the Commissioners of Imprest Accounts, or" and ".". |
| 41 Geo. 3. (U.K.) c. 54 | Isle of Man Trade Act 1801 | An Act the title of which begins with the words,—An Act to continue, until the Fifth Day of July,—and ends with the words,—and also to repeal and amend certain of the Provisions of the said Act. | The whole act. |
| 41 Geo. 3. (U.K.) c. 55 | Militia Allowances Act 1801 | An Act the title of which begins with the words,—An Act to revive and continue, until the Twenty-fifth Day of March,—and ends with the words,—and to amend the said Act. | The whole act. |
| 41 Geo. 3. (U.K.) c. 56 | Militia Allowances (No. 2) Act 1801 | An Act for making Allowances in certain Cases to Subaltern Officers of the Militia in Time of Peace. | The whole act. |
| 41 Geo. 3. (U.K.) c. 58 | Stamps (Ireland) Act 1801 | An Act the title of which begins with the words,—An Act for granting to His Majesty, until the Twenty-fifth Day of March,—and ends with the words,—Kerry Roads, which have been or may be granted being duly stamped. | The whole act. |
| 41 Geo. 3. (U.K.) c. 59 | Annuities to Lady Abercrombie, etc. Act 1801 | An Act for settling and securing a certain Annuity on Lady Abercromby, Baroness Abercromby of Aboukir, and the Two next Persons to whom the Title of Baron Abercromby shall descend, in consideration of the eminent Merits of the late Right Honourable General Sir Ralph Abercromby. | The whole act. |
| 41 Geo. 3. (U.K.) c. 61 | Suppression of Rebellion (Ireland) (No. 2) Act 1801 | An Act the title of which begins with the words,—An Act for further continuing until the Twenty-fifth Day of March,—and ends with the words,—Property of His Majesty's faithful subjects within the same. | The whole act. |
| 41 Geo. 3. (U.K.) c. 63 | House of Commons (Clergy Disqualification) Act 1801 | An Act to remove Doubts respecting the Eligibility of Persons in Holy Orders to sit in the House of Commons. | Section Two from "Provided" to end of that Section. |
| 41 Geo. 3. (U.K.) c. 64 | Debtors Relief Act 1801 | An Act for the further Relief of Debtors, with respect to the Imprisonment of their Persons. | The whole act. |
| 41 Geo. 3. (U.K.) c. 66 | Indemnity Act 1801 | An Act for indemnifying such Persons as since the First Day of January One thousand seven hundred and ninety-three, have acted in the apprehending, imprisoning, or detaining in Custody, in Great Britain, of Persons suspected of High Treason or Treasonable Practices. | The whole act. |
| 41 Geo. 3. (U.K.) c. 67 | Militia (Scotland) Act 1801 | An Act to amend several Acts for raising a Militia Force in Scotland. | The whole act. |
| 41 Geo. 3. (U.K.) c. 70 | Insolvent Debtors Relief Act 1801 | An Act for the Relief of certain Insolvent Debtors. | The whole act. |
| 41 Geo. 3. (U.K.) c. 73 | Certain Parliamentary Grants Act 180 | An Act for directing the Application of several Sums granted by Parliament to the Dublin Society, and to the Farming Societies in Ireland. | The whole act. |
| 41 Geo. 3. (U.K.) c. 77 | Fish, Newfoundland, etc. Act 1801 | An Act for allowing, until the First Day of August One thousand eight hundred and two, the Importation of certain Fish from Newfoundland and the Coast of Labrador, and for granting a Bounty thereon. | The whole act. |
| 41 Geo. 3. (U.K.) c. 79 | Public Notaries Act 1801 | An Act for the better Regulation of Publick Notaries in England | Sections Six, Eleven, Twelve and Fifteen. |
| 41 Geo. 3. (U.K.) c. 81 | Loans or Exchequer Bills Act 1801 | An Act for enabling His Majesty to raise the Sum of Two Millions for the Uses and Purposes therein mentioned. | The whole act. |
| 41 Geo. 3. (U.K.) c. 82 | Loans or Exchequer Bills (No. 2) Act 1801 | An Act for raising the Sum of Six millions five hundred thousand Pounds by Loans or Exchequer Bills, for the Service of Great Britain, for the Year One thousand eight hundred and one. | The whole act. |
| 41 Geo. 3. (U.K.) c. 83 | Loans or Exchequer Bills (No. 3) Act 1801 | An Act for raising the Sum of Three Millions by Loans or Exchequer Bills, for the Service of Great Britain, for the Year One thousand eight hundred and one. | The whole act. |
| 41 Geo. 3. (U.K.) c. 84 | Appropriation, etc. Act 1801 | An Act the title of which begins with the words,—An Act for granting to His Majesty certain Sums of Money out of the Consolidated Fund,—and ends with the words,—appropriating the Supplies granted in this Session of Parliament. | The whole act. |
| 41 Geo. 3. (U.K.) c. 85 | Fines by Justices Act 1801 | An Act for better Payment of Fines and Forfeitures imposed by Justices out of Session in England | Section One from "and shall" to end of that Section. Section Two. Section Three from "and a Copy" to "be made". Sections Four to Six. |
| 41 Geo. 3. (U.K.) c. 90 | Crown Debts Act 1801 | An Act for the more speedy and effectual Recovery of Debts due to His Majesty, His Heirs and Successors, in Right of the Crown of the United Kingdom of Great Britain and Ireland; and for the better Administration of Justice within the same | Sections Seven and Eight. |
| 41 Geo. 3. (U.K.) c. 92 | Bounties (No. 3) Act 1801 | An Act to alter the Bounties payable on Wheaten Flour and Indian Corn imported into Ireland; and for providing a Method for ascertaining the Forfeitures created by an Act of this Session of Parliament to prohibit the Exportation of Malt, and distilling of Spirits from Grain in Ireland. | The whole act. |
| 41 Geo. 3. (U.K.) c. 93 | Importation (No. 3) Act 1801 | An Act to continue, until the Twenty-fifth Day of March One thousand eight hundred and two, so much of an Act made in the present Session of Parliament as permits British Hops to be imported into Ireland at a low Rate of Duty. | The whole act. |
| 41 Geo. 3. (U.K.) c. 94 | Customs (No. 3) Act 1801 | An Act the title of which begins with the words,—An Act to empower the Importers or Proprietors of Rum,—and ends with the words,—Twenty-fifth Day of March One thousand eight hundred and eight. | The whole act. |
| 41 Geo. 3. (U.K.) c. 95 | Trade with America Act 1801 | An Act to facilitate the Trade and Intercourse between Ireland and the United States of America, during the Continuance of the Treaty of Amity, Commerce, and Navigation between His Majesty and the said States. | The whole act. |
| 41 Geo. 3. (U.K.) c. 100 | Repeal of a Certain Tax Act 1801 | An Act to repeal the Tax on Salaries, Profits of Employments, Fees, and Pensions in Ireland, of Persons not resident in Ireland for a certain Period. | The whole act. |
| 41 Geo. 3. (U.K.) c. 101 | Controverted Elections Act 1801 | An Act the title of which begins with the words,—An Act for regulating, until the First Day of May,—and ends with the words,—Qualifications of Members to serve in the said United Parliament. | The whole act. |
| 41 Geo. 3. (U.K.) c. 102 | Pluralities of Livings Act 1801 | An Act to stay, until the Twenty-fifth Day of March One thousand eight hundred and two, Proceedings in Actions under the Statute of King Henry the Eighth for abridging Spiritual Persons from having Pluralities of Livings, and from taking of Farms. | The whole act. |
| 41 Geo. 3. (U.K.) c. 103 | Malta Act 1801 | An Act to empower His Majesty to regulate the Trade and Commerce to and from the Isle of Malta until the signing a Definitive Treaty of Peace, and from thence until Six Weeks after the next Meeting of Parliament; and to declare the Isle of Malta to be Part of Europe | Except Section Three. |
| 41 Geo. 3. (U.K.) c. 104 | Suppression of Rebellion (Ireland) (No. 1) Act 1801 | An Act for indemnifying such Persons as have acted since the Twenty-fifth Day of March One thousand seven hundred and ninety-nine, for the Preservation of the publick Peace, and Suppression of Insurrections and Rebellion prevailing in several Districts of that Part of the United Kingdom called Ireland. | The whole act. |
| 41 Geo. 3. (U.K.) c. 106 | Imprisonment for Debts Abroad Act 1801 | An Act to secure certain Persons born within the Territories of France and other Persons therein described, from Imprisonment for Debts contracted in Parts beyond the Seas, other than the Dominions of His Majesty. | The whole act. |
| 42 Geo. 3. c. 1 | Duties on Malt, etc. Act 1801 | An Act for continuing and granting to His Majesty certain Duties upon Malt, Mum, Cyder, and Perry, for the Service of the Year One thousand eight hundred and two. | The whole act. |
| 42 Geo. 3. c. 2 | Duties on Pensions, etc. Act 1801 | An Act for continuing and granting to His Majesty a Duty on Pensions, Offices, and Personal Estates, in England, Wales, and the Town of Berwick upon Tweed; and certain Duties on Sugar, Malt, Tobacco, and Snuff, for the Service of the Year One thousand eight hundred and two. | The whole act. |
| 42 Geo. 3. c. 4 | Repeal of 41 Geo. 3 (Great Britain) c. 17, etc. Act 1801 | An Act the title of which begins with the words,—An Act to repeal an Act, made in the Forty-first Year,—and ends with the words,—Sale any Bread within the Time prohibited by the said Act. | The whole act. |
| 42 Geo. 3. c. 5 | Duty on Worts, etc. Act 1801 | An Act the title of which begins with the words,—An Act to continue, until the First Day of January,—and ends with the words,—Distillation of Spirits in Scotland from Molasses or Sugar at a lower Rate of Duty. | The whole act. |
| 42 Geo. 3. c. 6 | Lottery Act 1801 | An Act the title of which begins with the words,—An Act to rectify a Mistake in an Act made in the last Session,—and ends with the words,—Commencement of the Drawing of the said Lottery. | The whole act. |
| 42 Geo. 3. c. 7 | Importation (No. 2) Act 1801 | An Act to repeal an Act, made in the Thirty-ninth Year of the Reign of His present Majesty, intituled An Act to permit, until the First Day of August One thousand eight hundred and two, the Importation of certain Naval Stores from Hamburgh and other Ports of Germany. | The whole act. |
| 42 Geo. 3. c. 9 | | An Act for raising the Sum of Five Millions by Loans or Exchequer Bills, for the Service of the United Kingdom, for the Year One thousand eight hundred and two. | The whole act. |
| 42 Geo. 3. c. 10 | Loans or Exchequer Bills Act 1801 | An Act the title of which begins with the words,—An Act to revive and continue, until the First Day of January,—and ends with the words,—Price of Corn in this Kingdom. | The whole act. |
| 42 Geo. 3. c. 11 | Correspondence with Foreign Parts Act 1801 | An Act to remove certain Restraints upon the Correspondence by Letter between Persons residing in Great Britain and Ireland, and Persons residing in certain Foreign Countries. | The whole act. |
| 42 Geo. 3. c. 13 | Corn, etc. Act 1801 | An Act the title of which begins with the words,—An Act to continue until the First Day of January,—and ends with the words,—Importation into Ireland of Corn, Fish, and Provisions, without Payment of Duty. | The whole act. |
| 42 Geo. 3. c. 15 | Distillation from Wheat (Ireland) Act 1801 | An Act to prohibit the Distillation of Spirits from Wheat in Ireland. | The whole act. |
| 42 Geo. 3. c. 16 | Importation (No. 3) Act 1801 | An Act the title of which begins with the words,—An Act to continue, until the Fifth Day of July,—and ends with the words,—Kingdom or State in Amity with his Majesty. | The whole act. |
| 42 Geo. 3. c. 17 | Loans or Exchequer Bills Act 1802 | An Act for raising a further Sum of Money by Loans or Exchequer Bills, for the Service of Great Britain for the Year One thousand eight hundred and two. | The whole act. |
| 42 Geo. 3. c. 21 | Loans or Exchequer Bills (No. 2) Act 1802 | An Act for raising the Sum of One Million by Loans or Exchequer Bills, for the Service of Great Britain for the Year One thousand eight hundred and two. | The whole act. |
| 42 Geo. 3. c. 25 | Mutiny Act 1802 | An Act for the Amendment of the Laws relating to the better Payment of the Army and their Quarters, within the United Kingdom and the Islands of Jersey, Guernsey, Alderney, Sark, and Man. | The whole act. |
| 42 Geo. 3. c. 26 | Marine Mutiny Act 1802 | An Act for the Regulation of His Majesty's Marine Forces while on Shore, until the Twenty-fifth Day of May One thousand eight hundred and two. | The whole act. |
| 42 Geo. 3. c. 27 | Countervailing Duties Act 1802 | An Act the title of which begins with the words,—An Act to empower His Majesty to cause certain countervailing Duties,—and ends with the words,—under certain Circumstances. | The whole act. |
| 42 Geo. 3. c. 28 | Transportation Act 1802 | An Act the title of which begins with the words,—An Act for continuing until the Twenty-fifth Day of March,—and ends with the words,—temporary Places of Confinement in England and Scotland respectively. | The whole act. |
| 42 Geo. 3. c. 29 | Fort Marlborough in India Act 1802 | An Act to authorize the East India Company to make their Settlement at Fort Marlborough, in the East Indies, a Factory subordinate to the Presidency of Fort William in Bengal, and to transfer the Servants who, on the Reduction of that Establishment, shall be Supernumerary, to the Presidency of Fort Saint George. | Repealed as to all Her Majesty's Dominions. |
| 42 Geo. 3. c. 30 | Proceedings Against Spiritual Persons Act 1802 | An Act the title of which begins with the words,—An Act to continue, until the Twenty-fifth Day of July,—and ends with the words,—Pluralities of Livings, and from taking of Farms. | The whole act. |
| 42 Geo. 3. c. 31 | Duties Continuance Act 1802 | An Act for continuing, until the Twenty-fifth Day of March One thousand eight hundred and three, several Acts of the last Session of Parliament, for continuing and granting Duties to His Majesty in Ireland. | The whole act. |
| 42 Geo. 3. c. 35 | Trade in Grain, etc. Act 1802 | An Act for regulating, until the Fifteenth Day of February One thousand eight hundred and three, the Prices at which Grain, Meal, and Flour may be exported from Great Britain to Ireland, and from Ireland to Great Britain. | The whole act. |
| 42 Geo. 3. c. 36 | Collection of Revenues (Ireland) Act 1802 | An Act to continue, until the Twenty-ninth day of September One thousand eight hundred and three, several Acts of the last Session of Parliament, for reviving, continuing, and amending several Laws for the better Collection and Security of the Revenues of Ireland. | The whole act. |
| 42 Geo. 3. c. 39 | Repayment of Certain Loans Act 1802 | An Act for granting to His Majesty several Sums of Money advanced by way of Loan to several Persons connected with and trading to the Islands of Grenada and Saint Vincent. | The whole act. |
| 42 Geo. 3. c. 40 | Restriction on Cash Payments Act 1802 | An Act to continue, until the First day of March One thousand eight hundred and three, the Provisions contained in several Acts of the Thirty-seventh and Thirty-eighth Years of the Reign of His present Majesty, for Payment in Cash by the Bank. | The whole act. |
| 42 Geo. 3. c. 41 | Exchequer Bills Act 1802 | An Act to enable the Lords Commissioners of His Majesty's Treasury of Great Britain to issue Exchequer Bills, on the Credit of such Aids or Supplies as have been or shall be granted by Parliament, for the Service of Great Britain for the Year One thousand eight hundred and two. | The whole act. |
| 42 Geo. 3. c. 42 | Income Tax Repeal, etc. Act 1802 | An Act for repealing the Duties on Income; for the effectual Collection of Arrears of the said Duties, and accounting for the same; and for charging the Annuities specifically charged thereon upon the Consolidated Fund of Great Britain. | The whole act. |
| 42 Geo. 3. c. 45 | Restriction on Cash Payments (Ireland) Act 1802 | An Act the title of which begins with the words,—An Act to continue, until Three Months after any Restriction,—and ends with the words,—Payments in Cash by the Bank of Ireland. | The whole act. |
| 42 Geo. 3. c. 46 | Parish Apprentices Act 1802 | An Act the title of which begins with the words,—An Act to regulate, increase, and reduce the Pay,—and ends with the words,—authorized as to do by subsequent Acts | Section Eight. |
| 42 Geo. 3. c. 48 | Annuities to Duke of Sussex etc. Act 1802 | An Act for enabling His Majesty to settle an Annuity of Twelve thousand Pounds on His Royal Highness the Duke of Sussex, and a like Annuity of Twelve thousand Pounds on His Royal Highness the Duke of Cambridge, during His Majesty's Pleasure. | The whole act. |
| 42 Geo. 3. c. 49 | Militia Pay (England) Act 1802 | An Act for defraying the Charge of the Pay of the Militia in England, for the Year One thousand eight hundred and two. | The whole act. |
| 42 Geo. 3. c. 50 | Mutiny (No. 2) Act 1802 | An Act for continuing an Act, made in this Session of Parliament, intituled An Act for punishing Mutiny and Desertion; and for the better Payment of the Army and their Quarters, within the United Kingdom, and the Islands of Jersey, Guernsey, Alderney, Sark, and Man. | The whole act. |
| 42 Geo. 3. c. 51 | Marine Mutiny (No. 2) Act 1802 | An Act for continuing, until the Twenty-fifth Day of June One thousand eight hundred and two, an Act made in this Session of Parliament, for the Regulation of His Majesty's Marine Forces while on Shore. | The whole act. |
| 42 Geo. 3. c. 52 | Post Horse Duties Act 1802 | An Act the title of which begins with the words,—An Act for further continuing, until the First Day of February,—and ends with the words,— House of Peers, Peeresses, or Persons as by Time, or such Persons as should be willing to contract for the same. | The whole act. |
| 42 Geo. 3. c. 53 | Indemnity (Ireland) Act 1802 | An Act to indemnify Persons who have omitted to qualify themselves for Offices or Employments in Ireland according to Law. | The whole act. |
| 42 Geo. 3. c. 54 | Lotteries Act 1802 | An Act for granting to His Majesty a certain Sum of Money to be raised by Lotteries. | The whole act. |
| 42 Geo. 3. c. 55 | Militia Allowances Act 1802 | An Act for making Allowances in certain Cases to Subaltern Officers of the Militia, during Peace. | The whole act. |
| 42 Geo. 3. c. 56 | Medicines Stamp Act 1802 | An Act to repeal an Act, passed in the Twenty-fifth Year of His present Majesty, for laying and granting Stamp Duties on certain Medicines, and for charging other Duties in lieu thereof; and for making effectual Provision for the better Collection of the said Duties | Sections Five to Seven. Section Eight to "Act; and". Sections Nine to Twenty-two and Twenty-four. Section Twenty-eight to "notwithstanding; and". Section Twenty-nine. |
| 42 Geo. 3. c. 57 | National Debt Commissioners Act 1802 | An Act the title of which begins with the words,—An Act to amend so much of an Act made in the Parliament of Ireland,—and ends with the words,— as relates to the Commissioners for carrying the same into Execution. | The whole act. |
| 42 Geo. 3. c. 59 | Bounties Act 1802 | An Act for allowing, until the Twentieth Day of May One thousand eight hundred and three, additional Bounties on refined Sugar exported, and discontinuing the Duty thereon granted by an Act of this Session of Parliament. | The whole act. |
| 42 Geo. 3. c. 60 | Drawbacks Act 1802 | An Act the title of which begins with the words,—An Act to continue, until the Thirtieth Day of May,—and ends with the words,—additional Drawback on the Exportation of refined Sugar. | The whole act. |
| 42 Geo. 3. c. 62 | Oaths at Parliamentary Elections Act 1802 | An Act the title of which begins with the words,—An Act for extending the Provisions of an Act, made in the Thirty-fourth Year,—and ends with the words,—Votes at Elections for Members to serve in Parliament. | The whole act. |
| 42 Geo. 3. c. 64 | Militia Allowances (No. 2) Act 1802 | An Act the title of which begins with the words,—An Act to revive and further continue, until the Twenty-fifth Day of March,—and ends with the words,—distinguished under an Act of the same Session of Parliament. | The whole act. |
| 42 Geo. 3. c. 65 | Militia Allowances (No. 3) Act 1802 | An Act for making Allowances, until the Twenty-fifth Day of March One thousand eight hundred and three, in certain Cases, to Subaltern Officers of the Militia of Ireland, during Peace. | The whole act. |
| 42 Geo. 3. c. 68 | Yeomanry (Ireland) Act 1802 | An Act for enabling His Majesty to accept and continue the Services of certain Troops or Companies of Yeomanry in Ireland | The last Section. |
| 42 Geo. 3. c. 69 | Exercise of Trade by Soldiers, etc. Act 1802 | An Act to enable such Officers, Mariners, and Soldiers as have been in the Land or Sea Service, or in the Marines, or in the Militia, or any Corps of Fencible Men, since the Twenty-fourth Year of His present Majesty's Reign, to exercise Trades. | The whole act. |
| 42 Geo. 3. c. 72 | Militia (Stannaries) Act 1802 | An Act for repealing an Act, made in the Thirty-eighth Year of the Reign of His present Majesty, intituled An Act for raising a Body of Miners in the Counties of Cornwall and Devon, for the Defence of the Kingdom during the present War; and for the more effectually raising and regulating a Body of Miners for the Defence of Great Britain | Section One from "from and after" to "and that" from "and shall extend" to "of this Act;". Section Two to the words "from and after the Commencement" to "Commission in" and so far as the rest of that Section relates to the qualifications of officers. Section Three so far as it relates to the qualifications of officers. Section Five from "and no such" to end of that Section. Section Six from "and Notice of" to "Devon respectively;". Section Twenty to "General; and". Sections Twenty-three, Twenty-eight and Thirty. |
| 42 Geo. 3. c. 73 | Health and Morals of Apprentices Act 1802 | An Act for the Preservation of the Health and Morals of Apprentices and others, employed in Cotton and other Mills, and Cotton and other Factories | Section Five. Section Eight from "and in Scotland where the Parents" to "as the same is administered in Churches in Scotland,". Section Sixteen so far as it relates to Ireland. |
| 42 Geo. 3. c. 74 | Loans for Erection of Workhouses Act 1802 | An Act to amend an Act, made in the Twenty-second Year of the Reign of His present Majesty, for the better Relief and Employment of the Poor, so far as relates to the Payment of the Debts incurred for building any Poor House. | The whole act. |
| 42 Geo. 3. c. 75 | Linen Manufacture (Ireland) Act 1802 | An Act to amend the Laws for the better Regulation of the Linen Manufacture in Ireland. | The whole act. |
| 42 Geo. 3. c. 76 | Metropolitan Police Magistrates Act 1802 | An Act the title of which begins with the words,—An Act for repealing Two Acts, made in the Thirty-second and Thirty-sixth Years,—and ends with the words,—and from thence to the end of the then next Session of Parliament. | The whole act. |
| 42 Geo. 3. c. 80 | Goods in Neutral Ships Act 1802 | An Act the title of which begins with the words,—An Act for repealing several Acts, made in the Thirty-fifth, Thirty-sixth, and Thirty-ninth and Fortieth Years,—and ends with the words,—First Day of January One thousand eight hundred and four. | The whole act. |
| 42 Geo. 3. c. 83 | Duties, etc., on Coffee, etc. Act 1802 | An Act the title of which begins with the words,—An Act to continue, until the Twenty-ninth Day of September,—and ends with the words,—Licences to Persons in Ireland, not being Maltsters or Makers of Malt, selling Malt by Commission or otherwise. | The whole act. |
| 42 Geo. 3. c. 86 | Pluralities of Living, etc. Act 1802 | An Act the title of which begins with the words,—An Act to continue, until the Eighth Day of April,—and ends with the words,—Leases of Benefices and other Ecclesiastical Livings, with Cure. | The whole act. |
| 42 Geo. 3. c. 88 | Mutiny (No. 3) Act 1802 | An Act for punishing Mutiny and Desertion; and for the better Payment of the Army and their Quarters. | The whole act. |
| 42 Geo. 3. c. 90 | Militia Act 1802 | An Act for amending the Laws relating to the Militia in England | Section One. Section Two from "and shall certify" to "disapproved by His Majesty". Sections Two, Six to Eight, Ten to Fourteen, Seventeen, One hundred and forty-one and One hundred and fifty, so far as they relate to the qualifications of officers or the counties, ridings, or places of which estates required as qualifications for deputy lieutenants are to be in or in which officers are to be resident. Section Four so far as it relates to commissions of officers in the Militia. Section Nine. Section Thirteen from "and produce" to end of that Section. Sections Fifteen, Sixteen, Nineteen and Twenty. Section Twenty-seven so far as the words "be the same". Section Forty-three from "nor any Teachers" to "Purposes of this Act,". Sections Fifty-two, Fifty-three, Fifty-six, Fifty-nine, Sixty, and Seventy-one. Section Seventy-eight from "and every such Surgeon shall" to "Company,". Section Seventy-seven from "although" to "for Captain". Section Eighty-three so far as it provides what shall be the staff of the disembodied Militia or the pay of such staff and so far as it relates to the oath therein mentioned. Section Eighty-four from "all which" to end of that Section. Section Eighty-seven from "with the Approbation" to end of that Section. Section Ninety-nine. Section One hundred and six from "and it shall" to end of that Section. Section One hundred and seventeen from "and every Serjeant" to "or more;" and from "and such Adjutant" to end of that Section. Section One hundred and twenty-nine from "and if any" to end of that Section. Sections One hundred and forty-six, One hundred and forty-seven, One hundred and forty-eight, One hundred and fifty-four, and One hundred and seventy-five. Section One hundred and seventy-six so far as it relates to courts in the principality of Wales or of the county palatine of Chester. Schedules A. to D. |
| 42 Geo. 3. c. 91 | Militia (Scotland) Act 1802 | An Act to raise and establish a Militia Force in Scotland | Sections Two to Seven. Sections Eight and Ten so far as they relate to officers in the Militia. Section Nine so far as it relates to the qualifications of officers in the Militia. Section Fourteen. Section Fifteen to "in Manner herein-after directed;". Section One hundred and seventy. |
| 42 Geo. 3. c. 92 | Aliens Act 1802 | An Act for repealing several Acts for establishing Regulations respecting Aliens arriving in this Kingdom, or resident therein, in certain Cases; and for substituting other Provisions in lieu thereof. | The whole act. |
| 42 Geo. 3. c. 95 | Customs Act 1802 | An Act to authorize the Commissioners of Excise to order the Restoration of exciseable Goods seized or detained by Officers of Excise. | The whole act. |
| 42 Geo. 3. c. 98 | Isle of Man Trade Act 1802 | An Act the title of which begins with the words,—An Act to continue until the First Day of July,—and ends with the words,—Manufactures of the Isle of Man; and for improving the Revenue thereof. | The whole act. |
| 42 Geo. 3. c. 100 | Duties on Horses, etc. Act 1802 | An Act the title of which begins with the words,—An Act for enlarging the Time for which Horses may be let to Hire,—and ends with the words,— Provisional Notes of Cavalry, and not reimbursed to them by Assessment. | The whole act. |
| 42 Geo. 3. c. 102 | Tortola Trade Act 1802 | An Act the title of which begins with the words,—An Act for enabling His Majesty to permit the Importation and Exportation,—and ends with the words,—Six Weeks after the Commencement of the then next Session of Parliament. | The whole act. |
| 42 Geo. 3. c. 104 | Lottery Regulations Act 1802 | An Act the title of which begins with the words,—An Act to require Persons licensed to keep Lottery Offices in Ireland,—and ends with the words,—a certain Sum of Money into the Exchequer of Ireland. | The whole act. |
| 42 Geo. 3. c. 105 | Lord Chancellor of Ireland Act 1802 | An Act for providing a proper Salary for the Office of the Chancellor or Keeper of the Great Seal of Ireland. | The whole act. |
| 42 Geo. 3. c. 106 | Controverted Elections (No. 2) Act 1802 | An Act for regulating the Trial of Controverted Elections or Returns of Members to serve in the United Parliament for Ireland. | Repealed so long as 31 & 32 Vict. c. 125. s. 60, continues in force. |
| 42 Geo. 3. c. 108 | Quartering of Soldiers Act 1802 | An Act for increasing the Rates of Subsistence to be paid to Innkeepers and others on quartering Soldiers. | The whole act. |
| 42 Geo. 3. c. 110 | Loans or Exchequer Bills (No. 3) Act 1802 | An Act for raising the Sum of Five Millions by Loans or Exchequer Bills, for the Service of Great Britain, for the Year One thousand eight hundred and three. | The whole act. |
| 42 Geo. 3. c. 111 | Loans or Exchequer Bills (No. 4) Act 1802 | An Act for raising the Sum of One Million five hundred thousand Pounds, by Loans or Exchequer Bills, for the Service of Great Britain for the Year One thousand eight hundred and three. | The whole act. |
| 42 Geo. 3. c. 113 | Annuity to Lord Hutchinson, etc. Act 1802 | An Act for settling and securing a certain Annuity on Lord Hutchinson, Baron Hutchinson of Alexandria, and of Knocklofty, in the County of Tipperary, and the two next Persons to whom the Title of Baron Hutchinson shall descend, in consideration of his eminent Services. | The whole act. |
| 42 Geo. 3. c. 114 | Southern Whale Fishery (No. 2) Act 1802 | An Act for extending the Provisions of Two Acts, of the Thirty-fifth and Thirty-ninth Years of His present Majesty, so far as they relate to the Encouragement of Persons coming to Milford Haven for the Purpose of carrying on the Southern Whale Fishery. | The whole act. |
| 42 Geo. 3. c. 115 | Marine Mutiny (No. 3) Act 1802 | An Act for the Regulation of His Majesty's Royal Marine Forces while on Shore. | The whole act. |
| 42 Geo. 3. c. 116 | Land Tax Redemption Act 1802 | An Act the title of which begins with the words,—An Act for consolidating the Provisions of the several Acts passed for the Redemption and Sale of the Land Tax,—and ends with the words,—the Land Tax upon which shall have been redeemed or purchased | Section One from "save also and" to "Execution thereof". Sections Four, Eighteen and Nineteen. Section Twenty from "provided no Offer" to end of that Section. Section Twenty-five to "and two; and". Section Twenty-six. Section Twenty-nine from "and shall be applicable" to "Parliament". Section Thirty-six, Thirty-four. Section Thirty-seven from "and the said Commissioners of the Treasury" to end of that Section. Section Sixty-eight from "and all Persons whomsoever" to end of that Section. Sections Seventy-five, Seventy-three and One hundred and thirteen. Section One hundred and nineteen from "Provided always, that no" to end of that Section. Sections One hundred and twenty-two and One hundred and thirty-two to One hundred and thirty-seven. Section One hundred and thirty-eight to "such Contract; and". Section One hundred and forty so far as it relates to anything to be done in respect of Crown lands within the survey and receipt of the Exchequer. Sections One hundred and forty-two, One hundred and fifty to One hundred and fifty-four, One hundred and fifty-six, One hundred and fifty-seven, One hundred and sixty. Section One hundred and sixty-two to "the contrary notwithstanding, " and ". Sections One hundred and sixty-three, One hundred and seventy-four, One hundred and seventy-five, One hundred and seventy-eight and One hundred and seventy-nine. Section One hundred and eighty-four from "Provided always" to end of that Section. Sections One hundred and eighty-six, One hundred and eighty-seven, One hundred and ninety-four, One hundred and ninety-five, One hundred and ninety-eight and Two hundred. So much of the rest of the Act as relates to the purchase of land tax. |
| 42 Geo. 3. c. 118 | Militia (Ireland) (No. 2) Act 1802 | An Act the title of which begins with the words,—An Act for defraying the Charge of the Pay of the Militia of Ireland,—and ends with the words,—Time such Militia shall not be embodied. | The whole act. |
| 42 Geo. 3. c. 119 | Gaming Act 1802 | An Act to suppress certain Games and Lotteries not authorised by Law | Section Six from "and every" to end of that Section. |
| 42 Geo. 3. c. 120 | Appropriation Act 1802 | An Act the title of which begins with the words,—An Act for granting to His Majesty certain Sums of Money out of the respective Consolidated Funds,—and ends with the words,—appropriating the Supplies granted in this Session of Parliament. | The whole act. |
| 43 Geo. 3. c. 1 | Negotiations of Notes and Bills Act 1802 | An Act the title of which begins with the words,—An Act for further restricting, until the Expiration of Six Weeks,—and ends with the words,—Issues of Promissory Notes and Bills of Exchange, under a limited Sum, within that Part of Great Britain called Scotland. | The whole act. |
| 43 Geo. 3. c. 3 | Duties on Malt, etc. Act 1802 | An Act for continuing and granting to His Majesty certain Duties upon Malt, Mum, Cyder, and Perry, for the Service of the Year One thousand eight hundred and three. | The whole act. |
| 43 Geo. 3. c. 4 | Duties on Pensions, etc. Act 1802 | An Act for continuing and granting to His Majesty a Duty on Pensions, Offices, and Personal Estates, in England, Wales, and the Town of Berwick-upon-Tweed; and certain Duties on Sugar, Malt, Tobacco, and Snuff, for the Service of the Year One thousand eight hundred and three. | The whole act. |
| 43 Geo. 3. c. 5 | Loans or Exchequer Bills (No. 5) Act 1802 | An Act for raising the Sum of Five Millions by Loans or Exchequer Bills, on the Credit of such Aids or Supplies as have been or shall be granted by Parliament for the Service of Great Britain, for the Year One thousand eight hundred and three. | The whole act. |
| 43 Geo. 3. c. 8 | Baking Trade, Dublin Act 1802 | An Act the title of which begins with the words,—An Act for reviving and continuing for Five Years,—and ends with the words,—indemnifying all Persons who have acted in pursuance of any of the Provisions of the said Acts, or any of them. | The whole act. |
| 43 Geo. 3. c. 9 | Militia Pay (Ireland) Act 1802 | An Act the title of which begins with the words,—An Act to rectify a Mistake in an Act, made in the last Session,—and ends with the words,— relative to the Pay of Serjeants, Corporals, and Drummers. | The whole act. |
| 43 Geo. 3. c. 11 | Drawbacks and Bounties Act 1802 | An Act for discontinuing certain Drawbacks and Bounties on the Exportation of Sugar from Great Britain, and for allowing other Drawbacks and Bounties in lieu thereof, until the Fifteenth Day of January One thousand eight hundred and four. | The whole act. |
| 43 Geo. 3. c. 12 | Exportations, etc. Act 1802 | An Act the title of which begins with the words,—An Act to continue, until the First Day of January,—and ends with the words,—regulating the Trade and Commerce to and from the Isle of Malta. | The whole act. |
| 43 Geo. 3. c. 13 | Exportations, etc. (No. 2) Act 1802 | An Act the title of which begins with the words,—An Act to continue, until the First Day of January,—and ends with the words,—Importation into Ireland of Corn, Fish, and Provisions, without Payment of Duty. | The whole act. |
| 43 Geo. 3. c. 14 | Trade Between Great Britain and Ireland Act 1802 | An Act the title of which begins with the words,—An Act for continuing, until the First Day of July,—and ends with the words,—Stock Corn from Great Britain to Ireland, and the Importation of Malt into Great Britain from Ireland. | The whole act. |
| 43 Geo. 3. c. 16 | Inquiry into Certain Frauds and Abuses Act 1802 | An Act the title of which begins with the words,—An Act for appointing Commissioners to enquire and examine into any Irregularities,—and ends with the words,—managing the Business of the said Department, and of Prize Agency, in future. | The whole act. |
| 43 Geo. 3. c. 17 | Drawbacks (No. 2) Act 1802 | An Act for discontinuing certain Drawbacks and Bounties on the Exportation of Sugar from Ireland, and for allowing, until the Fifteenth Day of January One thousand eight hundred and four, other Drawbacks and Bounties instead thereof. | The whole act. |
| 43 Geo. 3. c. 20 | Mutiny Act 1803 | An Act for punishing Mutiny and Desertion; and for the better Payment of the Army and their Quarters. | The whole act. |
| 43 Geo. 3. c. 24 | Duties Continuance Act 1803 | An Act for continuing, until the Twenty-fifth Day of March One thousand eight hundred and four, several Acts for granting and continuing Duties to His Majesty in Ireland. | The whole act. |
| 43 Geo. 3. c. 26 | Annuity to Prince of Wales, etc. Act 1803 | An Act the title of which begins with the words,—An Act for enabling His Majesty to settle an Annuity on His Royal Highness the Prince of Wales,—and ends with the words,—Revenues of the Duchy of Cornwall to the Commissioners appointed by the said Act. | The whole act. |
| 43 Geo. 3. c. 27 | Marine Mutiny Act 1803 | An Act for the Regulation of His Majesty's Royal Marine Forces while on Shore. | The whole act. |
| 43 Geo. 3. c. 32 | Greenland Whale Fishery Act 1803 | An Act for allowing Vessels employed in the Greenland Whale Fishery, to complete their full Number of Men at certain Ports for the present Season. | The whole act. |
| 43 Geo. 3. c. 34 | Actions Against Certain Spiritual Persons Act 1803 | An Act the title of which begins with the words,—An Act to continue, until the Eighth Day of July,—and ends with the words,—Leases of Benefices, and other Ecclesiastical Livings, with Cure. | The whole act. |
| 43 Geo. 3. c. 36 | Loans or Exchequer Bills Act 1803 | An Act for raising the Sum of Four Millions by Loans or Exchequer Bills, for the Service of Great Britain, for the Year One thousand eight hundred and three. | The whole act. |
| 43 Geo. 3. c. 37 | Annuity to Admiral Saumarez Act 1803 | An Act to enable His Majesty to grant a certain Annuity to Rear Admiral Sir James Saumarez, Knight of the most Honourable Order of the Bath, in consideration of his eminent Services which he has performed on various Occasions. | The whole act. |
| 43 Geo. 3. c. 38 | Militia (Great Britain) Act 1803 | An Act to provide, until the Twenty-fifth Day of March One thousand eight hundred and four, for the more speedy and effectual Completion of the Establishment of Officers in the Militia of Great Britain; and for extending the Time limited by Law for certain Purposes therein mentioned. | The whole act. |
| 43 Geo. 3. c. 39 | Distribution of Certain Monies Act 1803 | An Act for appointing Commissioners for distributing the Money stipulated to be paid by the United States of America, under the Convention made between His Majesty and the said United States, among the Persons having Claims to Compensation out of such Money. | The whole act. |
| 43 Geo. 3. c. 40 | Grenada and Saint Vincent Traders Act 1803 | An Act for enlarging the Period for the Payment of Part of certain Sums of Money advanced by way of Loan to several Persons connected with and trading to the Islands of Grenada and Saint Vincent. | The whole act. |
| 43 Geo. 3. c. 41 | Quartering of Soldiers Act 1803 | An Act for increasing the Rates of Subsistence to be paid to Innkeepers and others on quartering Soldiers. | The whole act. |
| 43 Geo. 3. c. 42 | Duties, etc., on Sugar, etc. Act 1803 | An Act the title of which begins with the words,—An Act to continue, until the Twenty-fifth Day of March,—and ends with the words,—Duties on Sugar and Coffee exported, and allowing British Plantation Sugar to be warehoused. | The whole act. |
| 43 Geo. 3. c. 43 | Collection of Revenue (Ireland) Act 1803 | An Act to continue, until the Twenty-ninth Day of September One thousand eight hundred and four, several Acts of Parliament for the better Collection and Security of His Majesty's Revenue in Ireland; and for preventing Frauds therein. | The whole act. |
| 43 Geo. 3. c. 44 | Restrictions on Cash Payments (Ireland) Act 1803 | An Act the title of which begins with the words,—An Act to amend and continue,—and ends with the words,—Restrictions on Payments in Cash by the Bank of Ireland. | The whole act. |
| 43 Geo. 3. c. 45 | Justices of the Peace, Nottingham Act 1803 | An Act for more effectually preserving the Peace, and securing the Freedom of Election, in the Town of Nottingham, and County of the said Town | Section Two. |
| 43 Geo. 3. c. 46 | Costs Act 1803 | An Act to facilitate the more effectual Recovery, and vexatious Arrests and Suits; and to authorize the levying of Poundage upon Executions in certain Cases | Sections One, Three, and Five. |
| 43 Geo. 3. c. 47 | Relief of Families of Militiamen Act 1803 | An Act for consolidating and amending the several Laws for providing Relief for the Families of Militia Men embodied and called into actual Service | Section Nine from "and" to "shall serve,". Sections Fourteen and Fifteen. Section Sixteen from "or any Private Militia Man" and "or other Private Militia Man". Section Seventeen from "who shall forthwith" to end of that Section. Section Twenty-three so far as it relates to the certificate of any justice or justices. Sections Twenty-four, Twenty-five, and Twenty-eight. |
| 43 Geo. 3. c. 49 | Exportation Act 1803 | An Act to amend so much of several Acts, passed in the Sixth and Seventh Year, and in the Seventh and Eighth Year of the Reign of King William the Third, as relates to the Exportation of Silver Bullion. | The whole act. |
| 43 Geo. 3. c. 50 | Militia Act 1803 | An Act for raising, annually, certain Sums of Money, for the Service of Great Britain, under Three Acts, passed in the Forty-second Year of His present Majesty; and for amending the said Acts | Section One. Section Two from "and the Deputy Lieutenants" to end of that Section. Section Ten, and Section Eleven from "and other Men" to end of that Section; but these last Two Sections so far only as they relate to the Militia raised in England. |
| 43 Geo. 3. c. 51 | Land Tax Redemption Act 1803 | An Act to render more effectual an Act, passed in the Forty-second Year of His present Majesty's Reign, for consolidating the Provisions of the several Acts passed for the Redemption and Sale of the Land Tax | Section Three. |
| 43 Geo. 3. c. 52 | Exportation of Gunpowder Act 1803 | An Act for indemnifying all Persons who have been concerned in issuing or carrying into Execution certain Orders made for the Prevention of the Exportation of Gunpowder, Saltpetre, and Naval Stores, and the Exportation of Seed Corn to Norway. | The whole act. |
| 43 Geo. 3. c. 53 | Process (Ireland) Act 1803 | An Act the title of which begins with the words,—An Act to render the process of His Majesty's Court of King's Bench, Common Pleas, and Exchequer,—and ends with the words,—compelling the Appearance of Defendants in personal Actions. | The whole act. |
| 43 Geo. 3. c. 54 | Parochial Schools (Scotland) Act 1803 | An Act for making better Provision for the Parochial Schoolmasters, and for making further Regulations for the better Government of the Parish Schools in Scotland | Section One. |
| 43 Geo. 3. c. 55 | Defence of the Realm Act 1803 | An Act to enable His Majesty more effectually to provide for the Defence and Security of the Realm during the present War; and for indemnifying Persons who may suffer in their Property by such Measures as may be necessary for that Purpose. | The whole act. |
| 43 Geo. 3. c. 57 | Trade During Hostilities Act 1803 | An Act for the better Protection of the Trade of the United Kingdom during the present Hostilities with France. | The whole act. |
| 43 Geo. 3. c. 60 | Exchequer Bills Act 1803 | An Act for remedying certain defects that have occurred in the issuing of certain Exchequer Bills. | The whole act. |
| 43 Geo. 3. c. 62 | Militia (Great Britain) (No. 2) Act 1803 | An Act for transferring to the Royal Navy such Seamen as are now serving in the Militia of Great Britain. | The whole act. |
| 43 Geo. 3. c. 63 | East India Company (No. 2) Act 1803 | An Act the title of which begins with the words,—An Act to explain and amend an Act, made in the Thirty-ninth Year,—and ends with the words,—to continue until the Twenty-fifth Day of March One thousand eight hundred and five. | The whole act. |
| 43 Geo. 3. c. 64 | Supply of Seamen Act 1803 | An Act for the better Supply of Mariners and Seamen to serve in His Majesty's Ships of War, and on board Merchant Ships and other trading Ships and Vessels, during the present Hostilities. | The whole act. |
| 43 Geo. 3. c. 70 | Customs (No. 2) Act 1803 | An Act for granting to His Majesty, during the present War, and until the Ratification of a Definitive Treaty of Peace, additional Duties on the Importation and Exportation of certain Goods, Wares, and Merchandize, and on the Tonnage of Ships and Vessels in Great Britain. | The whole act. |
| 43 Geo. 3. c. 71 | Militia (Great Britain) (No. 3) Act 1803 | An Act for augmenting the Number of Field Officers and other Officers of Militia within Great Britain. | The whole act. |
| 43 Geo. 3. c. 72 | Militia Allowances Act 1803 | An Act for making Allowances in certain Cases to Subaltern Officers of the Militia in Great Britain, while disembodied. | The whole act. |
| 43 Geo. 3. c. 73 | Medicines Stamp Act 1803 | An Act the title of which begins with the words,—An Act to amend an Act, made in the Forty-second Year,—and ends with the words,—Provisions for the better Collection of the said Duties | Sections One and Four. |
| 43 Geo. 3. c. 75 | Estates of Lunatics Act 1803 | An Act for transferring to the Royal Navy such Seamen as are now serving in the Militia of Ireland. | The whole act. |
| 43 Geo. 3. c. 77 | Indemnity (Ireland) Act 1803 | An Act to indemnify Persons who have omitted to qualify themselves for Offices or Employments in Ireland, according to Law. | The whole act. |
| 43 Geo. 3. c. 78 | Trade Between Great Britain and Ireland Act 1803 | An Act the title of which begins with the words,—An Act for continuing, until the First Day of August,—and ends with the words,—Importation of Malt into Great Britain from Ireland. | The whole act. |
| 43 Geo. 3. c. 80 | Highway (Scotland) Act 1803 | An Act the title of which begins with the words,—An Act for granting to His Majesty the Sum of Twenty thousand Pounds,—and ends with the words,—keeping in Repair Roads and Bridges in the Highlands of Scotland. | The whole act. |
| 43 Geo. 3. c. 81 | Excise (No. 2) Act 1803 | An Act for granting to His Majesty, until Twelve Months after the Ratification of the Definitive Treaty of Peace, certain additional Duties of Excise in Great Britain. | The whole act. |
| 43 Geo. 3. c. 82 | Defence of the Realm (England) Act 1803 | An Act to enable His Majesty more effectually to raise and assemble, in England, an additional Military Force, for the better Defence and Security of the United Kingdom, and for the more vigorous Prosecution of the War. | The whole act. |
| 43 Geo. 3. c. 83 | Defence of the Realm (Scotland) Act 1803 | An Act to enable His Majesty more effectually to raise and assemble an additional Military Force in Scotland, for the better Defence and Security of the United Kingdom, and for the more vigorous Prosecution of the War. | The whole act. |
| 43 Geo. 3. c. 85 | Defence of the Realm (Ireland) Act 1803 | An Act to enable His Majesty more effectually to raise and assemble, in Ireland, an additional Military Force, for the better Defence and Security of the United Kingdom, and for the more vigorous Prosecution of the War. | The whole act. |
| 43 Geo. 3. c. 86 | Unlawful Combinations (Ireland) Act 1803 | An Act to suspend, until the Twenty-fifth Day of March One thousand eight hundred and four, the Operation of an Act of the last Session of Parliament, for establishing Regulations respecting Aliens arriving in this Kingdom, or resident therein, in certain Cases | Sections Fifteen and Sixteen. Section Twenty-one from "and shall be laid" to "Defence". Schedule. |
| 43 Geo. 3. c. 88 | Militia Pay (Ireland) Act 1803 | An Act the title of which begins with the words,—An Act for defraying, until the Twenty-fifth Day of March,—and ends with the words,—Allowances in certain Cases to Subaltern Officers of the said Militia during Peace. | The whole act. |
| 43 Geo. 3. c. 89 | Militia (Scotland) Act 1803 | An Act for providing Relief for the Families of Militia Men in Scotland, when called out into actual Service | Except Section Twenty-one to "Militia Force in Scotland,". |
| 43 Geo. 3. c. 91 | Lotteries Act 1803 | An Act for granting to His Majesty a certain Sum of Money to be raised by Lotteries. | The whole act. |
| 43 Geo. 3. c. 93 | Loans or Exchequer Bills (No. 2) Act 1803 | An Act for raising the Sum of Five Millions by Loans or Exchequer Bills, for the Service of Great Britain, for the Year One thousand eight hundred and three. | The whole act. |
| 43 Geo. 3. c. 94 | Militia Pay and Allowances Act 1803 | An Act for defraying the Charge of the Pay and Cloathing of the Militia in Great Britain for the Year One thousand eight hundred and three. | The whole act. |
| 43 Geo. 3. c. 95 | Militia Pay and Allowances (No. 2) Act 1803 | An Act the title of which begins with the words,—An Act to revive and further continue, until the Twenty-fifth Day of March,—and ends with the words,—Militia of England, disembodied under an Act of the same Session of Parliament. | The whole act. |
| 43 Geo. 3. c. 97 | Collection of Revenue (Ireland) (No. 2) Act 1803 | An Act to amend several Acts of Parliament for the better Collection and Security of His Majesty's Revenue of Customs and Excise in Ireland, and for preventing Frauds therein; and to make further Regulations relating thereto. | The whole act. |
| 43 Geo. 3. c. 99 | Taxes Act 1803 | An Act for consolidating certain of the Provisions contained in any Act or Acts relating to the Duties under the Management of the Commissioners for the Affairs of Taxes, and for amending the same. | Sections One to Seven. Section Ten to "be recovered". Section Twelve to "done; and". Section Eighteen so far as it relates to neglect to appoint assessors. Section Twenty to "appointed; and". Section Twenty-eight. Section Twenty-nine from "except always" to end of that Section. Sections Forty-eight to Fifty, Fifty-two, Fifty-five, Fifty-seven, Fifty-eight, and Sixty-two. Section Sixty-three from "and in default" to end of that Section. Section Sixty-four from "and the Informer" to "entitled unto," and from "or be subject" to end of that Section. Section Sixty-nine. Schedule (A.). |
| 43 Geo. 3. c. 102 | Caledonian Canal Act 1803 | An Act for granting to His Majesty the Sum of Twenty thousand Pounds, towards defraying the Expense of making an Inland Navigation from the Eastern Sea, near Inverness, to the Western Sea, by Inverness and Fort William, and for taking the necessary Steps towards executing the said Work. | Sections One to Three and Six to Twenty-two. |
| 43 Geo. 3. c. 103 | Bonding of Wine Act 1803 | An Act to permit Foreign Wine to be bonded and warehoused in the United Kingdom without Payment of Duties, under certain Restrictions, for a limited Time. | The whole act. |
| 43 Geo. 3. c. 104 | Grenada and Saint Vincent Traders (No. 2) Act 1803 | An Act to rectify a Mistake in an Act made in this present Session of Parliament, intituled An Act for enlarging the Period for the Payment of Part of certain Sums of Money advanced by way of Loan to several Persons connected with and trading to the Islands of Grenada and Saint Vincent. | The whole act. |
| 43 Geo. 3. c. 105 | Exportation (No. 2) Act 1803 | An Act to permit the Exportation, for a limited Time, of a certain Quantity of Corn, Grain, Meal, Flour, Bread, Biscuit, or Pulse, to the Islands of Guernsey, Jersey, and Alderney, from other Ports in England as well as the Port of Southampton, under certain Restrictions. | The whole act. |
| 43 Geo. 3. c. 110 | Loans for Erection of Workhouses Act 1803 | An Act the title of which begins with the words,—An Act to explain and amend an Act, made in the last Session,—and ends with the words,—Payment of the Debts incurred for building any Poorhouse. | The whole act. |
| 43 Geo. 3. c. 114 | Treasury Bills (Ireland) Act 1803 | An Act for raising the Sum of One Million Irish Currency, by Treasury Bills, for the Service of Ireland, for the Year One thousand eight hundred and three. | The whole act. |
| 43 Geo. 3. c. 115 | Excisable Goods on the Thames Act 1803 | An Act the title of which begins with the words,—An Act to explain and amend Two Acts, made in the Second, and Thirty-ninth and Fortieth Years,—and ends with the words,—Seizure of Exciseable Commodities. | The whole act. |
| 43 Geo. 3. c. 116 | Habeas Corpus Suspension (Ireland) Act 1803 | An Act the title of which begins with the words,—An Act to empower the Lord Lieutenant, or other Chief Governor or Governors of Ireland,—and ends with the words,—next Session of Parliament. | The whole act. |
| 43 Geo. 3. c. 117 | Suppression of Rebellion, etc. (Ireland) Act 1803 | An Act for the Suppression of Rebellion in Ireland, and for the Protection of the Persons and Property of His Majesty's faithful Subjects there, to continue in force until Six Weeks after the Commencement of the next Session of Parliament. | The whole act. |
| 43 Geo. 3. c. 121 | Yeomanry and Volunteer Cavalry Act 1803 | An Act the title of which begins with the words,—An Act for authorizing the billetting of such Troops of Yeomanry and Volunteer Cavalry,—and ends with the words,—and for the further regulating of such Yeomanry and Volunteer Corps. | The whole act. |
| 43 Geo. 3. c. 122 | Income Tax Act 1803 | An Act for granting to His Majesty, until the Sixth day of May next after the Ratification of a Definitive Treaty of Peace, a Contribution on the Profits arising from Property, Professions, Trades, and Offices. | The whole act. |
| 43 Geo. 3. c. 123 | Defence of the Realm (England) (No. 2) Act 1803 | An Act for completing Persons serving, or who have served, in the additional Military Force, raised under an Act of this Session of Parliament, from being balloted to serve in the Militia of England. | The whole act. |
| 43 Geo. 3. c. 125 | Levy en Masse (London) Act 1803 | An Act the title of which begins with the words,—An Act to empower His Majesty to suspend the Ballot or Enrolment for the Militia,—and ends with the words,—Military Service of His liege Subjects in case of Invasion of the Realm. | The whole act. |
| 43 Geo. 3. c. 129 | Excise (No. 3) Act 1803 | An Act the title of which begins with the words,—An Act to amend so much of an Act made in this Session,—and ends with the words,—more effectually securing the Duties on Coffee | Except Section Two from "or any burnt, scorched, or roasted Pease, Beans, or other Grain, or vegetable Substance or Substances prepared" to end. |
| 43 Geo. 3. c. 133 | Tortola Trade, etc. Act 1803 | An Act the title of which begins with the words,—An Act to continue, until the Twenty-fifth Day of March,—and ends with the words,—prohibiting the Importation of Foreign Wrought Silks and Velvets into Great Britain. | The whole act. |
| 43 Geo. 3. c. 135 | American Treaty Commissioners Act 1803 | An Act the title of which begins with the words,—An Act for the removing of Doubts respecting the Validity of Assignments,—and ends with the words, recover the Interest so assigned. | The whole act. |
| 43 Geo. 3. c. 136 | Woollen Manufacture Act 1803 | An Act the title of which begins with the words,—An Act to suspend, until the First Day of July,—and ends with the words,—Persons employed or concerned in the said Manufacture. | The whole act. |
| 43 Geo. 3. c. 137 | East India Company (No. 3) Act 1803 | An Act to enable the Court of Directors of the East India Company to make reasonable Allowances to the Owners of certain Ships, in the Service of the said Company, on Account of the extraordinary Expense attending the Outfit of the said Ships, between certain Periods. | The whole act. |
| 43 Geo. 3. c. 138 | Courts of Justice, Canada Act 1803 | An Act for extending the Jurisdiction of the Courts of Justice in the Provinces of Lower and Upper Canada, to the Trial and Punishment of Persons guilty of Crimes and Offences within certain parts of North America adjoining to the said Provinces. | Repealed as to all Her Majesty's Dominions. |
| 43 Geo. 3. c. 144 | Poor Act 1803 | An Act for procuring Returns relative to the Expense and Maintenance of the Poor in England. | The whole act. |
| 43 Geo. 3. c. 145 | Malt Duties, etc. (Scotland) Act 1803 | An Act for more effectually securing certain Duties on Malt, and for preventing Frauds by Makers of Malt from Bear or Bigg in Scotland. | The whole act. |
| 43 Geo. 3. c. 146 | Loans or Exchequer Bills (No. 3) Act 1803 | An Act for enabling His Majesty to raise the Sum of Two Millions for the Uses and Purposes therein mentioned. | The whole act. |
| 43 Geo. 3. c. 147 | Loans or Exchequer Bills (No. 4) Act 1803 | An Act for raising the Sum of Two million five hundred thousand Pounds, by Loans or Exchequer Bills, for the Service of Great Britain for the Year One thousand eight hundred and three. | The whole act. |
| 43 Geo. 3. c. 148 | Exchequer Bills Act 1803 | An Act to enable the Lords Commissioners of His Majesty's Treasury of Great Britain to issue Exchequer Bills on the Credit of such Aids or Supplies as have been or shall be granted by Parliament for the Service of Great Britain for the Year One thousand eight hundred and three. | The whole act. |
| 43 Geo. 3. c. 149 | Grant to the House of Orange Act 1803 | An Act for enabling His Majesty to settle an Annuity of Fifteen thousand Pounds on the House of Orange, during His Majesty's Pleasure. | The whole act. |
| 43 Geo. 3. c. 150 | Taxes (Scotland) Act 1803 | An Act for consolidating certain of the Provisions contained in any Act or Acts relating to the Duties under the Management of the Commissioners for the Affairs of Taxes, and for amending the said Acts, so far as the same relate to that Part of Great Britain called Scotland | Sections Two, Five, Six, Nine, Twelve, and Thirteen. Section Sixteen to "before mentioned; and". Section Twenty-five. Section Twenty-six from "except always" to end of that Section. Sections Thirty-four to Thirty-six, Forty-five, Forty-seven, and Fifty-three. Section Fifty-four from "and in Default" to end of that Section. Section Fifty-five from "and the Informer" to "entitled unto," and from "or be subject" to end of that Section. Section Sixty. Schedule (A.). |
| 43 Geo. 3. c. 154 | Countervailing Duty Act 1803 | An Act the title of which begins with the words,—An Act for granting to His Majesty certain countervailing Duties,—and ends with the words,— Salmon and Cod Fish from the Island of Newfoundland and the Coast of Labrador, into Great Britain and Ireland. | The whole act. |
| 43 Geo. 3. c. 155 | Aliens Act 1803 | An Act the title of which begins with the words,—An Act to repeal an Act, passed in the last Session,—and ends with the words,—Regulations respecting Aliens arriving in this Kingdom, or resident therein, in certain Cases. | The whole act. |
| 43 Geo. 3. c. 156 | Prisage and Butlerage of Wines Act 1803 | An Act to enable the Commissioners of His Majesty's Treasury of Great Britain to contract for the Purchase of the Duties of Prisage and Butlerage of Wines. | The whole act. |
| 43 Geo. 3. c. 157 | Smuggling Act 1803 | An Act to make perpetual an Act, made in the Thirteenth Year of the Reign of King George the Second, relating to the Punishment of Persons going armed or disguised, and to the Relief of Officers of the Customs in Informations upon Seizures. | The whole act. |
| 43 Geo. 3. c. 161 | House Tax Act 1803 | An Act the title of which begins with the words,—An Act for repealing the several Duties under the Management of the Commissioners for the Affairs of Taxes,—and ends with the words,—new Duties on Persons selling Carriages by Auction, and certain Pensions | Sections One to Nine. Sections Ten and Fifty-five, so far as they relate to Schedule (A.). Sections Eleven to Fourteen. Section Fifteen, the words "the Number of Windows contained therein, and" and "or Dwelling" in that Section, and so much of that Section as relates to Schedule (A.). Section Seventeen to "which Notice" to end of that Section, and so far as the rest of that Section relates to Schedule (A.). Sections Eighteen to Twenty-three. Section Twenty-four from "and the said last-mentioned" to "hundred square Feet," and from "and every Person" to end of that Section. Sections Twenty-five to Forty-nine, Fifty-seven, and Fifty-eight. Section Sixty except so far as it relates to ascertaining the annual rent at which each dwelling house ought to be charged. Section Sixty-two except so far as it relates to certificates of assessment for the duties on inhabited dwelling houses according to the annual value thereof. Sections Sixty-three to Sixty-eight. Section Seventy-four and upon the Hearing" to end of that Section. Section Seventy-one. Section Seventy-two, the words "and in the Court of Great Sessions "for Offences committed in Wales,". Sections Seventy-four to Seventy-nine, and Eighty-one to Eighty-eight. The Schedules. |
| 43 Geo. 3. c. 162 | Appropriation Act 1803 | An Act the title of which begins with the words,—An Act for granting to His Majesty certain Sums of Money out of the respective Consolidated Funds,—and ends with the words,—appropriating the Supplies granted in this Session of Parliament. | The whole act. |
| 44 Geo. 3. c. 1 | Restriction on Cash Payments Act 1803 | An Act the title of which begins with the words,—An Act to continue, until Six Months after the Ratification of a Definitive Treaty of Peace,—and ends with the words,—Payments of Cash by the Bank of England. | The whole act. |
| 44 Geo. 3. c. 2 | Relief of Certain Curates (England) Act 1803 | An Act for granting to His Majesty the Sum of Eight thousand Pounds, for the present Relief of certain Curates in England. | The whole act. |
| 44 Geo. 3. c. 3 | Bonds of East India Company Act 1803 | An Act to regulate the Bonds issued by the East India Company, with respect to the Rate of Interest, and the Duty payable thereon. | The whole act. |
| 44 Geo. 3. c. 4 | Continuance of Laws Act 1803 | An Act the title of which begins with the words,—An Act to continue several Laws relating to the suspending the Operation of Two Acts,—and ends with the words,—until Six Months after the Ratification of a Definitive Treaty of Peace. | The whole act. |
| 44 Geo. 3. c. 5 | Drawbacks Act 1803 | An Act the title of which begins with the words,—An Act to continue, until the Twenty-fifth day of March,—and ends with the words,—allowing other Drawbacks and Bounties in lieu thereof. | The whole act. |
| 44 Geo. 3. c. 8 | Habeas Corpus Suspension (Ireland) Act 1803 | An Act the title of which begins with the words,—An Act to continue, until Six Weeks after the Commencement of the next Session,—and ends with the words,—conspiring against His Majesty's Person and Government, until Six Weeks after the Commencement of the next Session of Parliament. | The whole act. |
| 44 Geo. 3. c. 9 | Suppression of Rebellion, etc. (Ireland) Act 1803 | An Act the title of which begins with the words,—An Act to continue, until Six Weeks after the Commencement of the next Session,—and ends with the words,—His Majesty's faithful Subjects there, to continue in force until Six Weeks after the Commencement of the next Session of Parliament. | The whole act. |
| 44 Geo. 3. c. 10 | Drawbacks (No. 2) Act 1803 | An Act to continue, until the Twenty-fifth Day of March One thousand eight hundred and five, several Acts, made in the Forty-first, Forty-second, and Forty-third Years of His present Majesty's Reign, for regulating the Drawbacks and Bounties on the Exportation of Sugar from Ireland. | The whole act. |
| 44 Geo. 3. c. 11 | Distillation of Spirits Act 1803 | An Act the title of which begins with the words,—An Act for enabling the Lord Lieutenant or other Chief Governor or Governors of Ireland,—and ends with the words,—Government of Ireland, and Council of the same, for prohibiting such Distillation. | The whole act. |
| 44 Geo. 3. c. 12 | Exportation and Importation Act 1803 | An Act the title of which begins with the words,—An Act to continue, until the Twenty-fifth Day of March,—and ends with the words,—Importation into Ireland of Corn, Fish, and Provisions, without Payment of Duty. | The whole act. |
| 44 Geo. 3. c. 13 | Navy Act 1803 | An Act to prevent the Desertion and Escape of Petty Officers, Seamen, and others, from His Majesty's Service, by Means or under Colour of any Civil or Criminal Process | Section Seven. |
| 44 Geo. 3. c. 14 | Bonding of Wines Act 1803 | An Act to amend Two Acts, passed in the Forty-first and Forty-third Years of the Reign of His present Majesty, for permitting Portugal Wine to be landed and warehoused in the United Kingdom; and to allow Spanish Wine to be so landed and warehoused. | The whole act. |
| 44 Geo. 3. c. 15 | Loans or Exchequer Bills Act 1803 | An Act for raising the Sum of Five Millions by Loans or Exchequer Bills, on the Credit of such Aids or Supplies as have been or shall be granted by Parliament for the Service of Great Britain, for the Year One thousand eight hundred and four. | The whole act. |
| 44 Geo. 3. c. 16 | Duties on Malt Act 1803 | An Act for continuing and granting to His Majesty certain Duties upon Malt, in Great Britain, for the Service of the Year One thousand eight hundred and four. | The whole act. |
| 44 Geo. 3. c. 17 | Duties on Pensions, etc. Act 1803 | An Act for continuing and granting to His Majesty a Duty on Pensions, Offices, and Personal Estates, in England; and certain Duties on Sugar, Malt, Tobacco, and Snuff, in Great Britain, for the Service of the Year One thousand eight hundred and four. | The whole act. |
| 44 Geo. 3. c. 19 | Mutiny Act 1804 | An Act for punishing Mutiny and Desertion; and for the better Payment of the Army and their Quarters. | The whole act. |
| 44 Geo. 3. c. 20 | Marine Mutiny Act 1804 | An Act for the Regulation of His Majesty's Royal Marine Forces while on Shore. | The whole act. |
| 44 Geo. 3. c. 21 | Restriction on Cash Payments (Ireland) Act 1804 | An Act the title of which begins with the words,—An Act to continue, until Three Months after any Restriction imposed,—and ends with the words,—made by An Act made in the Forty-third Year of the Reign of His present Majesty. | The whole act. |
| 44 Geo. 3. c. 22 | Exportation Act 1804 | An Act to indemnify all Persons who have been concerned in issuing or carrying into execution an Order of the Lords Commissioners of His Majesty's Treasury for permitting the Exportation of Seed Corn to Portugal from Great Britain. | The whole act. |
| 44 Geo. 3. c. 23 | Greenland Fishery Act 1804 | An Act for allowing Vessels employed in the Greenland Whale Fishery, and clearing out from any Port in Great Britain, to complete their full Number of Men at certain Ports for the present Season. | The whole act. |
| 44 Geo. 3. c. 24 | Payment of Creditors (Scotland) Act 1804 | An Act for further continuing, until the Twenty-fifth Day of March One thousand eight hundred and six, an Act made in the Thirty-third Year of His present Majesty, for rendering the Payment of Creditors more equal and expeditious in Scotland. | The whole act. |
| 44 Geo. 3. c. 26 | Customs, Excise and Taxes Act 1804 | An Act the title of which begins with the words,—An Act to continue, until the Twenty-fifth Day of March,—and ends with the words,—Excise and Taxes in Ireland in lieu of former Rates, Duties, and Taxes, Bounties and Drawbacks. | The whole act. |
| 44 Geo. 3. c. 27 | Countervailing Duties Act 1804 | An Act the title of which begins with the words,—An Act for charging, until the Twenty-fifth Day of March,—and ends with the words,—Exportation to Great Britain of the several Articles therein mentioned, being the Growth, Produce, or Manufacture of Ireland. | The whole act. |
| 44 Geo. 3. c. 28 | Duty on Malt (Ireland) Act 1804 | An Act for granting to His Majesty a Duty upon Malt made in Ireland, for the Year One thousand eight hundred and four. | The whole act. |
| 44 Geo. 3. c. 29 | Importation Act 1804 | An Act for permitting, until the Fifth Day of May One thousand eight hundred and five, the Importation of Hides, Calf Skins, Horns, Tallow, and Wool, (except Cotton Wool), in Foreign Ships, on Payment of the like Duties as if imported in British or Irish Ships. | The whole act. |
| 44 Geo. 3. c. 30 | Importation (No. 2) Act 1804 | An Act the title of which begins with the words,—An Act to revive and continue, until Twelve Months after the Ratification of a Definitive Treaty of Peace,—and ends with the words,—Importation of certain Goods from America in Neutral Ships. | The whole act. |
| 44 Geo. 3. c. 31 | Loans or Exchequer Bills Act 1804 | An Act for raising the Sum of One Million by Loans or Exchequer Bills, on the Credit of such Aids or Supplies as have been or shall be granted by Parliament for the Service of Great Britain for the Year One thousand eight hundred and four. | The whole act. |
| 44 Geo. 3. c. 32 | Militia (Ireland) Act 1804 | An Act for empowering His Majesty, for a Time and to an Extent therein limited, to accept the Services of such Parts of His Militia Forces in Ireland as may voluntarily offer themselves to be employed in Great Britain. | The whole act. |
| 44 Geo. 3. c. 35 | Importation, etc. Act 1804 | An Act the title of which begins with the words,—An Act to amend and continue, so far as relates to the allowing the Importation,—and ends with the words,—residing in the said Island, to the Twenty-fifth Day of December One thousand eight hundred and five. | The whole act. |
| 44 Geo. 3. c. 36 | Bonding of Sugar Act 1804 | An Act to amend and continue, until the Twenty-fifth Day of March One thousand eight hundred and seven, so much of an Act, made in the Forty-first Year of His present Majesty, as relates to allowing British Plantation Sugar to be warehoused. | The whole act. |
| 44 Geo. 3. c. 37 | Income Tax Act 1804 | An Act the title of which begins with the words,—An Act to repeal so much of an Act, passed in the last Session,—and ends with the words,—Appeals from Judgment of Justices of the Peace. | The whole act. |
| 44 Geo. 3. c. 38 | Quartering of Soldiers Act 1804 | An Act for increasing the Rates of Subsistence to be paid to Innkeepers and others on quartering Soldiers. | The whole act. |
| 44 Geo. 3. c. 39 | Militia Pay (Great Britain) Act 1804 | An Act for defraying the Charge of the Pay and Cloathing of the Militia in Great Britain for the Year One thousand eight hundred and four. | The whole act. |
| 44 Geo. 3. c. 40 | Militia Allowances Act 1804 | An Act the title of which begins with the words,—An Act to revive and further continue, until the Twenty-fifth Day of March,—and ends with the words,—Militia of England, disembodied under an Act of the same Session of Parliament. | The whole act. |
| 44 Geo. 3. c. 41 | Militia Pay (Ireland) Act 1804 | An Act the title of which begins with the words,—An Act for defraying, until the Twenty-fifth Day of March,—and ends with the words,—Allowances in certain Cases to Subaltern Officers of the said Militia during Peace. | The whole act. |
| 44 Geo. 3. c. 42 | Linen Manufacture (Ireland) Act 1804 | An Act to amend an Act, made in the Forty-second Year of His present Majesty, to amend the Laws for the better Regulation of the Linen Manufacture of Ireland. | The whole act. |
| 44 Geo. 3. c. 45 | Loans or Exchequer Bills Act 1804 | An Act for raising the Sum of Eight Millions by Loans or Exchequer Bills, for the Service of Great Britain for the Year One thousand eight hundred and four. | The whole act. |
| 44 Geo. 3. c. 46 | Loans or Exchequer Bills Act 1804 | An Act for raising the Sum of One million five hundred thousand Pounds, by Loans or Exchequer Bills, for the Service of Great Britain for the Year One thousand eight hundred and four. | The whole act. |
| 44 Geo. 3. c. 50 | Militia Act 1804 | An Act the title of which begins with the words,—An Act to revive and continue, until the Twenty-fifth Day of March,—and ends with the words,—Militia of Great Britain; and for facilitating the filling up Vacancies therein. | The whole act. |
| 44 Geo. 3. c. 51 | Militia Act 1804 | An Act for making Allowances in certain Cases to Subaltern Officers of the Militia in Great Britain, while disembodied. | The whole act. |
| 44 Geo. 3. c. 53 | Customs Act 1804 | An Act the title of which begins with the words,—An Act for granting to His Majesty additional Duties in Great Britain,—and ends with the words,—Merchandise, brought or carried Coastwise, within Great Britain. | The whole act. |
| 44 Geo. 3. c. 54 | Yeomanry Act 1804 | An Act to consolidate and amend the Provisions of the several Acts relating to Corps of Yeomanry and Volunteers in Great Britain, and to make further Regulations relating thereto | Sections One and Ten. Section Eleven except "the Commission,". Sections Fourteen and Eighteen. Section Twenty from "every Person enrolled" to "Parliament, and" and from "to all such Persons as shall have" to "thereof, and". Section Thirty-two from "and shall have" to "from such Corps," and from "but subject" to "their Services,". Sections Thirty-four and Thirty-five. Section Thirty-six from "and all his" to "indemnified". Sections Fifty-four, Fifty-five, and Sixty-one. |
| 44 Geo. 3. c. 55 | Excisable Liquors (Scotland) Act 1804 | An Act for more effectually preventing the Sale of Exciseable Liquors in Scotland by Persons not duly licensed; and for altering the Mode of granting Licenses to Retailers of Spirits in that Part of the United Kingdom. | The whole act. |
| 44 Geo. 3. c. 59 | Certificates of Attorneys, etc. Act 1804 | An Act to indemnify Solicitors, Attorneys, and others, who have neglected to renew their Certificates within the Time limited by an Act made in the Thirty-seventh Year of His present Majesty; and to amend so much of the said Act as relates to the entering such Certificates. | The whole act. |
| 44 Geo. 3. c. 64 | Woollen Manufacture Act 1804 | An Act the title of which begins with the words,—An Act to continue, until the First Day of July,—and ends with the words,—Persons employed or concerned in the said Manufacture. | The whole act. |
| 44 Geo. 3. c. 65 | Exportation and Importation Act 1804 | An Act the title of which begins with the words,—An Act to continue, until the First Day of July,—and ends with the words,—Importation of Malt into Great Britain from Ireland. | The whole act. |
| 44 Geo. 3. c. 67 | Customs and Excise Act 1804 | An Act the title of which begins with the words,—An Act to continue and amend an Act,—and ends with the words,—Revenues to be raised in the same payable in British Currency. | The whole act. |
| 44 Geo. 3. c. 70 | Exportation (No. 2) Act 1804 | An Act to enable His Majesty to authorize the Exportation of the Machinery necessary for erecting a Mint in the Dominions of the King of Denmark. | The whole act. |
| 44 Geo. 3. c. 72 | East India Prize Goods Act 1804 | An Act for allowing the Sale of certain East India Prize Goods in the Port of London. | The whole act. |
| 44 Geo. 3. c. 73 | Exchequer Bills Act 1804 | An Act to enable the Lords Commissioners of His Majesty's Treasury of Great Britain to issue Exchequer Bills on the Credit of such Aids or Supplies as have been or shall be granted by Parliament for the Service of Great Britain for the Year One thousand eight hundred and four. | The whole act. |
| 44 Geo. 3. c. 75 | Enlistment of Foreigners Act 1804 | An Act the title of which begins with the words,—An Act for enabling Subjects of Foreign States to enlist as Soldiers,—and ends with the words,—or grant any such Commissions as aforesaid. | The whole act. |
| 44 Geo. 3. c. 76 | Annuity to Family of Lord Kilwarden Act 1804 | An Act for settling and securing a certain Annuity on the Viscountess Kilwarden, and on the Family of the late Arthur Lord Viscount Kilwarden. | The whole act. |
| 44 Geo. 3. c. 80 | Civil List Act 1804 | An Act for the better Support of His Majesty's Household, and of the Honour and Dignity of the Crown of the United Kingdom; and for preventing Accumulation of Arrears in the Payment out of the Civil List Revenues. | The whole act. |
| 44 Geo. 3. c. 81 | Loans or Exchequer Bills Act 1804 | An Act for enabling His Majesty to raise the Sum of Two millions five hundred thousand Pounds for the Uses and Purposes therein mentioned. | The whole act. |
| 44 Geo. 3. c. 82 | Accountant General in Chancery Act 1804 | An Act the title of which begins with the words,—An Act to obviate certain Inconveniences,—and ends with the words,—Contribution on the Profits arising from Property, Professions, Trades, and Offices. | The whole act. |
| 44 Geo. 3. c. 83 | Income Tax Act 1804 | An Act for regulating the Appointment of Commissioners to act in the Execution of an Act of the last Session of Parliament, for granting to His Majesty a Contribution on the Profits arising from Property, Professions, Trades, and Offices. | The whole act. |
| 44 Geo. 3. c. 85 | Import Duty Act 1804 | An Act the title of which begins with the words,—An Act for further continuing, for Seven Years,—and ends with the words,—Importation of Oak Bark, when the Price of such Bark shall exceed a certain Rate. | The whole act. |
| 44 Geo. 3. c. 89 | Importation, etc. Act 1804 | An Act the title of which begins with the words,—An Act for continuing certain Provisions of an Act, made in Ireland,—and ends with the words,—Use of Oats and Oatmeal in the Distillation of Spirits in Ireland. | The whole act. |
| 44 Geo. 3. c. 90 | Peace Preservation (Ireland) Act 1804 | An Act the title of which begins with the words,—An Act to continue, until Seven Years after the passing thereof,—and ends with the words,—Preservation of the Peace within Counties at large. | The whole act. |
| 44 Geo. 3. c. 92 | Apprehension of Offenders Act 1804 | An Act to render more easy the apprehending and bringing to Trial, Offenders escaping from One Part of the United Kingdom to the other, and also from One County to another. | The whole act. |
| 44 Geo. 3. c. 93 | Lotteries Act 1804 | An Act for granting to His Majesty a Sum of Money, to be raised by Lotteries. | The whole act. |
| 44 Geo. 3. c. 97 | Treasury Bills (Ireland) Act 1804 | An Act for raising the Sum of Eight hundred thousand Pounds Irish Currency, by Treasury Bills, for the Service of Ireland, for the Year One thousand eight hundred and four. | The whole act. |
| 44 Geo. 3. c. 98 | Stamp Act 1804 | An Act to repeal the several Duties under the Commissioners for managing the Duties upon stamped Vellum, Parchment, and Paper, in Great Britain, and to grant new and additional Duties in lieu thereof | Except Sections Two, Eight, Ten, Section Twenty-seven to "Sections respectively," and Schedules (A.) and (B.) so far as such Sections and Schedules relate to the duties or articles, and so far as the licenses for empowering persons to let horses for hire remain in force, so far as they relate to the allowances in Schedule (C.). |
| 44 Geo. 3. c. 103 | Customs and Excise (Ireland) Act 1804 | An Act for making further Regulations for the better Collection and Security of His Majesty's Revenue of Customs and Excise in Ireland, and for preventing Frauds therein. | The whole act. |
| 44 Geo. 3. c. 104 | Bonding of Spirits (Ireland) Act 1804 | An Act the title of which begins with the words,—An Act to permit, until the Twenty-fifth Day of March,—and ends with the words,—Exportation to Great Britain of Spirits made from Corn in Ireland. | The whole act. |
| 44 Geo. 3. c. 105 | Collection of Revenue (Ireland) Act 1804 | An Act to continue, until the Twenty-ninth Day of September One thousand eight hundred and five, several Acts for the better Collection and Security of His Majesty's Revenue in Ireland; and for preventing Frauds therein. | The whole act. |
| 44 Geo. 3. c. 106 | Inquiry into Public Offices (Ireland) Act 1804 | An Act the title of which begins with the words,—An Act for appointing, until the First Day of August,—and ends with the words,—accounting for public Money in Ireland. | The whole act. |
| 44 Geo. 3. c. 108 | Insolvent Debtors Relief Act 1804 | An Act for the Relief of certain Insolvent Debtors. | The whole act. |
| 44 Geo. 3. c. 110 | Appropriation Act 1804 | An Act the title of which begins with the words,—An Act for granting to His Majesty a certain Sum of Money out of the Consolidated Fund,—and ends with the words,—for further appropriating the Supplies granted in this Session of Parliament. | The whole act. |
| 45 Geo. 3. c. 1 | Duties on Malt Act 1805 | An Act for continuing and granting to His Majesty certain Duties upon Malt, in Great Britain, for the Service of the Year One thousand eight hundred and five. | The whole act. |
| 45 Geo. 3. c. 2 | Duties on Pensions, etc. Act 1805 | An Act for continuing and granting to His Majesty a Duty on Pensions, Offices, and Personal Estates, in England; and certain Duties on Sugar, Malt, Tobacco, and Snuff, in Great Britain, for the Service of the Year One thousand eight hundred and five. | The whole act. |
| 45 Geo. 3. c. 3 | Insolvent Debtors Relief Act 1805 | An Act to remedy certain Omissions in an Act passed in the last Session of Parliament, intituled An Act for the Relief of certain Insolvent Debtors. | The whole act. |
| 45 Geo. 3. c. 4 | Habeas Corpus Suspension (Ireland) Act 1805 | An Act the title of which begins with the words,—An Act to continue, until Six Weeks after the Commencement of the next Session,—and ends with the words,—conspiring against His Majesty's Person and Government. | The whole act. |
| 45 Geo. 3. c. 5 | Taxation Act 1805 | An Act the title of which begins with the words,—An Act for explaining and amending an Act made in the Forty-fourth Year,—and ends with the words,—Power of raising in Counties in certain Districts. | The whole act. |
| 45 Geo. 3. c. 7 | Loans or Exchequer Bills Act 1805 | An Act for raising the Sum of Three Millions by Loans or Exchequer Bills, for the Service of Great Britain, for the Year One thousand eight hundred and five. | The whole act. |
| 45 Geo. 3. c. 10 | Quarantine Act 1805 | An Act for making further Provision for the effectual Performance of Quarantine. | The whole act. |
| 45 Geo. 3. c. 13 | Assessed Taxes Act 1805 | An Act for granting to His Majesty additional Duties in Great Britain on Horses used in riding, or for drawing certain Carriages; and for consolidating the said additional Duties with the present Duties thereon. | The whole act. |
| 45 Geo. 3. c. 15 | Income Tax Act 1805 | An Act for granting to His Majesty additional Duties in Great Britain, on the Amount of Assessments to be charged on the Profits arising from Property, Professions, Trades, and Offices. | The whole act. |
| 45 Geo. 3. c. 16 | Mutiny Act 1805 | An Act for punishing Mutiny and Desertion; and for the better Payment of the Army and their Quarters. | The whole act. |
| 45 Geo. 3. c. 17 | Marine Mutiny Act 1805 | An Act for the Regulation of His Majesty's Royal Marine Forces while on Shore. | The whole act. |
| 45 Geo. 3. c. 18 | Customs Act 1805 | An Act the title of which begins with the words,—An Act to continue, until His Majesty, until the Twenty-fifth Day of March,—and ends with the words,—exported from Ireland, in lieu of former Rates and Duties, Drawbacks and Bounties. | The whole act. |
| 45 Geo. 3. c. 19 | Excise and Taxes (Ireland) Act 1805 | An Act for granting to His Majesty, until the Twenty-fifth Day of March One thousand eight hundred and six, certain Inland Duties of Excise and Taxes in Ireland, in lieu of former Duties of Excise and Taxes. | The whole act. |
| 45 Geo. 3. c. 22 | Duties on Malt, etc. Act 1805 | An Act for granting to His Majesty a Duty upon Malt made in Ireland, and upon Spirits made or distilled in Ireland, for the Year One thousand eight hundred and five. | The whole act. |
| 45 Geo. 3. c. 23 | Drawbacks, etc. (Ireland) Act 1805 | An Act to continue, until the Twenty-fifth Day of March One thousand eight hundred and six, and to amend, several Acts for regulating the Drawbacks and Bounties on the Exportation of Sugar from Ireland. | The whole act. |
| 45 Geo. 3. c. 24 | Bounties and Drawbacks Act 1805 | An Act the title of which begins with the words,—An Act for further continuing, until the Twenty-fifth Day of March,—and ends with the words,—allowing other Drawbacks and Bounties in lieu thereof. | The whole act. |
| 45 Geo. 3. c. 25 | Negotiations of Notes and Bills Act 1805 | An Act the title of which begins with the words,—An Act to continue an Act for suspending the Operation,—and ends with the words,—Ratification of a Definitive Treaty of Peace. | The whole act. |
| 45 Geo. 3. c. 26 | Importation, Exportation, etc. Act 1805 | An Act the title of which begins with the words,—An Act for continuing the Prohibition of the Exportation, and permitting the Warehousing of Spirits in Ireland for Exportation,—and ends with the words,—Twenty-fifth Day of March One thousand eight hundred and six. | The whole act. |
| 45 Geo. 3. c. 27 | Exchequer Bills Act 1805 | An Act to enable the Lords Commissioners of His Majesty's Treasury of Great Britain to issue Exchequer Bills, on the Credit of such Aids or Supplies as have been or shall be granted by Parliament for the Service of Great Britain, for the Year One thousand eight hundred and five. | The whole act. |
| 45 Geo. 3. c. 28 | Legacy Duty Act 1805 | An Act for granting to His Majesty additional Stamp Duties in Great Britain on certain Legacies | Except Section Five, Section Seven from "all the Provisions" to end of that Section, and Section Twelve. |
| 45 Geo. 3. c. 31 | Militia (Great Britain) Act 1805 | An Act for allowing a certain Proportion of the Militia in Great Britain voluntarily to enlist into His Majesty's Regular Forces and Royal Marines. | The whole act. |
| 45 Geo. 3. c. 32 | Foreign Ships, etc. Act 1805 | An Act the title of which begins with the words,—An Act to permit, until the Twenty-fifth Day of March,—and ends with the words,—Ratification of a Definitive Treaty of Peace. | The whole act. |
| 45 Geo. 3. c. 33 | Exportation and Importation Act 1805 | An Act the title of which begins with the words,—An Act to suspend certain Licences,—and ends with the words,—granting or acting under such Licences. | The whole act. |
| 45 Geo. 3. c. 34 | Importation Act 1805 | An Act to permit the Importation of Goods and Commodities from Countries in America belonging to any Foreign European Sovereign or State in Neutral Ships, during the present War, and until Six Months after the Ratification of a Definitive Treaty of Peace. | The whole act. |
| 45 Geo. 3. c. 35 | Treaty of Commerce, etc., with America Act 1805 | An Act the title of which begins with the words,—An Act to continue, until the First Day of June,—and ends with the words,—Navigation between His Majesty and the United States of America. | The whole act. |
| 45 Geo. 3. c. 36 | Forces of East India Company Act 1805 | An Act the title of which begins with the words,—An Act to enable the East India Company to appoint the Commander in Chief,—and ends with the words,—Forces in India, being vested in the same Person. | Repealed as to all Her Majesty's Dominions. |
| 45 Geo. 3. c. 37 | Quartering of Soldiers Act 1805 | An Act for increasing the Rates of Subsistence to be paid to Innkeepers and others on quartering Soldiers. | The whole act. |
| 45 Geo. 3. c. 38 | Irish Militia Act 1805 | An Act for allowing a certain Proportion of the Militia in Ireland voluntarily to enlist into His Majesty's Forces and Royal Marines. | The whole act. |
| 45 Geo. 3. c. 41 | Promissory Notes, etc. (Ireland) Act 1805 | An Act for restraining the Negotiation of certain Promissory Notes and Inland Bills of Exchange in England. | The whole act. |
| 45 Geo. 3. c. 43 | Highways (Ireland) Act 1805 | An Act to amend the Laws for improving and keeping in Repair the Post Roads in Ireland, and for rendering the Conveyance of Letters by His Majesty's Post Office more secure and expeditious. | The whole act. |
| 45 Geo. 3. c. 46 | Inquiry into Naval Departments Act 1805 | An Act the title of which begins with the words,—An Act to continue, until the End of the next Session,—and ends with the words,—Persons employed in the several Naval Departments therein mentioned. | The whole act. |
| 45 Geo. 3. c. 47 | Inquiry into Military Departments Act 1805 | An Act the title of which begins with the words,—An Act to appoint Commissioners to enquire and examine into any Irregularities,—and ends with the words,—Six Weeks after the Commencement of the next Session of Parliament. | The whole act. |
| 45 Geo. 3. c. 48 | Land Tax Act 1805 | An Act the title of which begins with the words,—An Act for appointing Commissioners for putting into execution an Act of this Session,—and ends with the words,—Land Tax, to be raised in Great Britain, for the Service of the Year One thousand seven hundred and ninety-eight. | The whole act. |
| 45 Geo. 3. c. 56 | Post Horse Duties Act 1805 | An Act the title of which begins with the words,—An Act for further continuing, until the First Day of February One thousand eight hundred and six,—and ends with the words,—Horses let for travelling Post and by Time for travelling. | The whole act. |
| 45 Geo. 3. c. 58 | Office of Paymaster General Act 1805 | An Act to repeal an Act, made in the Twenty-third Year of His present Majesty, for the Regulation of the Office of Paymaster General of His Majesty's Forces, and the more regular Payment of the Army; and for the more effectually regulating the said Office for the future. | The whole act. |
| 45 Geo. 3. c. 59 | Parliamentary Elections (Ireland) Act 1805 | An Act for amending an Act, passed in the Parliament of Ireland in the Thirty-fifth Year of His present Majesty, for regulating the Election of Members to serve in Parliament, so far as relates to Freeholds under the yearly Value of Twenty Pounds; and for making further and other Regulations relating thereto. | The whole act. |
| 45 Geo. 3. c. 60 | Militia Allowances Act 1805 | An Act for making Allowances in certain Cases to Subaltern Officers of the Militia in Great Britain, while disembodied. | The whole act. |
| 45 Geo. 3. c. 61 | Militia Allowances (No. 2) Act 1805 | An Act the title of which begins with the words,—An Act to revive and further continue, until the Twenty-fifth Day of March,—and ends with the words,—Militia of England, disembodied under an Act of the same Session of Parliament. | The whole act. |
| 45 Geo. 3. c. 62 | Militia Pay (Great Britain) Act 1805 | An Act for defraying the Charge of the Pay and Cloathing of the Militia in Great Britain for the Year One thousand eight hundred and five. | The whole act. |
| 45 Geo. 3. c. 63 | Militia Pay (Ireland) Act 1805 | An Act the title of which begins with the words,—An Act for defraying, until the Twenty-fifth Day of March,—and ends with the words,—Allowances in certain Cases to Subaltern Officers of the said Militia during Peace. | The whole act. |
| 45 Geo. 3. c. 64 | Harbours (Ireland) Act 1805 | An Act to repeal so much of an Act made in the Forty-first Year of His present Majesty, for granting Bounties for taking and bringing Fish to the Cities of London and Westminster, and other Places in the United Kingdom. | The whole act. |
| 45 Geo. 3. c. 65 | Inquiry into Public Offices (Ireland) Act 1805 | An Act the title of which begins with the words,—An Act to continue, until the Twenty-ninth Day of September,—and ends with the words,—present Mode of receiving, collecting, issuing, and accounting for public Monies in Ireland. | The whole act. |
| 45 Geo. 3. c. 66 | Preservation of Timber Trees, etc. Act 1805 | An Act to prevent in Great Britain the illegally carrying away Bark; and for amending Two Acts, passed in the Sixth and Ninth Years of His present Majesty's Reign, for the Preservation of Timber Trees, Underwoods, Roots, Shrubs, Plants, Hollies, Thorns, and Quicksets. | The whole act. |
| 45 Geo. 3. c. 68 | Sailcloth Manufacture, etc. Act 1805 | An Act the title of which begins with the words,—An Act for making perpetual an Act for declaring the Law with respect,—and ends with the words,—Colonies in America, and of the Officers of the Customs in Newfoundland. | The whole act. |
| 45 Geo. 3. c. 69 | Estates Held for the Barrack Service Act 1805 | An Act for vesting in the Barrack Master General for the Time being, Estates, held or occupied for the Barrack Service; and authorizing him to sell the same, with the Consent of the Lords Commissioners of His Majesty's Treasury. | The whole act. |
| 45 Geo. 3. c. 70 | Inquiry into Public Expenditure Act 1805 | An Act the title of which begins with the words,—An Act to rectify a Mistake in the Names of One of the Commissioners,—and ends with the words,—Business, in the Military Departments therein mentioned. | The whole act. |
| 45 Geo. 3. c. 71 | Taxes Act 1805 | An Act to amend the several Laws relating to the Duties under the Management of the Commissioners for the Affairs of Taxes | Section Two from "for the previous" to "said Acts". Section Three. |
| 45 Geo. 3. c. 74 | Lotteries Act 1805 | An Act for granting to His Majesty a Sum of Money, to be raised by Lotteries. | The whole act. |
| 45 Geo. 3. c. 76 | Civil List (Ireland) Act 1805 | An Act to amend an Act, made in the Parliament of Ireland, for the Support of the Honour and Dignity of His Majesty's Crown in Ireland; and for granting to His Majesty a Civil List Establishment under certain Provisions and Regulations. | The whole act. |
| 45 Geo. 3. c. 77 | Land Tax Redemption Act 1805 | An Act to amend and render more effectual an Act passed in the Forty-second Year of His present Majesty's Reign, for consolidating the Provisions of the several Acts passed for the Redemption and Sale of the Land Tax | Sections Three and Four. |
| 45 Geo. 3. c. 78 | Advance to Boyd, Benfield and Company Act 1805 | An Act to indemnify all Persons concerned in advancing Forty thousand Pounds to Messieurs Boyd, Benfield, and Company, in the Year One thousand seven hundred and ninety-six, out of the Monies issued for Naval Services. | The whole act. |
| 45 Geo. 3. c. 79 | Losses During Rebellion in Ireland Act 1805 | An Act to amend several Acts, passed in the Forty-third and Forty-fourth Years of His present Majesty's Reign, for appointing Commissioners to enquire into the Losses of such His Majesty's loyal Subjects as have suffered in their Property during the Rebellion in Ireland, and for other Purposes in the said Acts mentioned. | The whole act. |
| 45 Geo. 3. c. 80 | Continuance of Laws Act 1805 | An Act the title of which begins with the words,—An Act for continuing several Laws relating to the regulating the Prices at which Corn,—and ends with the words,—Importation of Hides and other Articles in Foreign Ships. | The whole act. |
| 45 Geo. 3. c. 82 | Duty on Woollen Goods Act 1805 | An Act for repealing the Duty chargeable on Woollen Goods of the Manufacture of Great Britain exported to the East Indies. | The whole act. |
| 45 Geo. 3. c. 83 | Woollen Manufacture Act 1805 | An Act the title of which begins with the words,—An Act to continue the Operation of an Act, passed in the last Session,—and ends with the words,—Persons employed or concerned in the said Manufacture. | The whole act. |
| 45 Geo. 3. c. 85 | Crinan Canal Act 1805 | An Act for authorizing the Commissioners of His Majesty's Treasury in Great Britain to advance a certain Sum of Money, to be applied in completing the Calder Canal. | The whole act. |
| 45 Geo. 3. c. 90 | Militia Act 1805 | An Act to empower His Majesty to retain upon Full Pay and Allowances Officers of the Militia during the War, notwithstanding the Reduction. | The whole act. |
| 45 Geo. 3. c. 92 | Writ of Subpœna Act 1805 | An Act the title of which begins with the words,—An Act to amend Two Acts of the Thirteenth and Forty-fourth Years,—and ends with the words,—Part of the United Kingdom called Great Britain | Except Sections Three and Four. |
| 45 Geo. 3. c. 94 | Duty on Hops Act 1805 | An Act for reducing the Duty of Excise on Hops the Growth of Great Britain. | The whole act. |
| 45 Geo. 3. c. 95 | Taxes (Scotland) Act 1805 | An Act the title of which begins with the words,—An Act to amend so much of an Act of the Forty-third Year,—and ends with the words,—Notices required to be delivered to Persons assessed to the said Duties | Sections Two and Three. |
| 45 Geo. 3. c. 97 | Indemnity for Certain Orders of Council Act 1805 | An Act to indemnify all Persons who have been concerned in issuing an Order of Council and Directions for extending the Time of certain Ships continuing to perform Quarantine. | The whole act. |
| 45 Geo. 3. c. 101 | Purchase of Advowsons by Colleges Act 1805 | An Act the title of which begins with the words,—An Act to repeal so much of an Act, passed in the Ninth Year,—and ends with the words,—Oxford and Cambridge from purchasing or holding Advowsons, except as therein provided. | The whole act. |
| 45 Geo. 3. c. 104 | Duties on Spirituous Liquors (Ireland) Act 1805 | An Act to continue, until the Twenty-ninth Day of September One thousand eight hundred and six, and amend, several Acts for regulating and securing the Collection of the Duties on Spirituous Liquors distilled in Ireland, and the Warehousing of such Spirits for Exportation. | The whole act. |
| 45 Geo. 3. c. 107 | Duty on Spanish Red Wines Act 1805 | An Act for charging, until the Twenty-fifth Day of March One thousand eight hundred and six, an additional Duty on Spanish Red Wine imported into Ireland. | The whole act. |
| 45 Geo. 3. c. 108 | Customs and Excise (Ireland) Act 1805 | An Act to continue, until the Twenty-ninth Day of September One thousand eight hundred and six, several Acts for the better Collection and Security of His Majesty's Revenue of Customs and Excise in Ireland, and for preventing Frauds therein. | The whole act. |
| 45 Geo. 3. c. 110 | Income Tax (No. 3) Act 1805 | An Act the title of which begins with the words,—An Act for exempting from the Duties or Profits arising from Property,—and ends with the words,—Books of the Bank of England. | The whole act. |
| 45 Geo. 3. c. 111 | County Infirmaries (Ireland) Act 1805 | An Act to amend and render more effectual an Act made in the Parliament of Ireland in the Fifth Year of His present Majesty, intituled An Act for erecting and establishing Publick Infirmaries or Hospitals in this Kingdom | Section Two. |
| 45 Geo. 3. c. 113 | Harbour of Howth Act 1805 | An Act for extending, improving, and regulating the Port and Harbour on the North Side of the Hill of Howth near Dublin, and rendering it a fit Situation for His Majesty's Packets. | The whole act. |
| 45 Geo. 3. c. 114 | Harbour of Leith Act 1805 | An Act for enabling the Commissioners of the Treasury of Great Britain to advance a certain Sum of Money to the Lord Provost, Magistrates, and Council of the City of Edinburgh, towards the Completion of the Docks and other Works in the Harbour of Leith. | The whole act. |
| 45 Geo. 3. c. 117 | Proceedings Against Luke Fox Act 1805 | An Act to continue the Proceedings in the House of Lords touching the Conduct of Luke Fox, Esquire, One of the Judges of the Court of Common Pleas of that Part of the United Kingdom called Ireland, notwithstanding any Prorogation or Dissolution of Parliament. | The whole act. |
| 45 Geo. 3. c. 118 | Loans or Exchequer Bills, etc. Act 1805 | An Act for raising the Sum of Eight Millions by Loans or Exchequer Bills, for the Service of Great Britain for the Year One thousand eight hundred and five. | The whole act. |
| 45 Geo. 3. c. 119 | Loans or Exchequer Bills, etc. (No. 2) Act 1805 | An Act the title of which begins with the words,—An Act for raising the Sum of Two millions five hundred thousand Pounds,—and ends with the words,—Money for the Public Service on the Credit of certain Exchequer Bills. | The whole act. |
| 45 Geo. 3. c. 120 | Loans or Exchequer Bills, etc. (No. 3) Act 1805 | An Act for raising the Sum of One million five hundred thousand Pounds by Loans or Exchequer Bills, for the Service of Great Britain for the Year One thousand eight hundred and five. | The whole act. |
| 45 Geo. 3. c. 124 | Privilege of Parliament Act 1805 | An Act the title of which begins with the words,—An Act to amend an Act, passed in the Fourth Year,—and ends with the words,—Appearances in Actions brought against Persons having Privilege of Parliament. | The whole act. |
| 45 Geo. 3. c. 125 | Proceedings Against Viscount Melville Act 1805 | An Act to provide that the Proceedings now depending in the House of Commons upon Articles of Charge of High Crimes and Misdemeanors which have been exhibited against Henry Lord Viscount Melville, shall not be discontinued by any Prorogation or Dissolution of Parliament. | The whole act. |
| 45 Geo. 3. c. 126 | Indemnity to Persons Giving Evidence Against Viscount Melville Act 1805 | An Act the title of which begins with the words,—An Act to indemnify Persons who shall give Evidence against Henry Lord Viscount Melville,—and ends with the words,—the Misapplication of His Majesty's Navy. | The whole act. |
| 45 Geo. 3. c. 127 | British Museum Act 1805 | An Act to vest the Townland Collection of Ancient Southern Nations in the Trustees of the British Museum, for the Use of the Publick | Sections One and Six. |
| 45 Geo. 3. c. 129 | Appropriation Act 1805 | An Act the title of which begins with the words,—An Act for granting to His Majesty certain Sums of Money out of the Consolidated Fund,—and ends with the words,—appropriating the Supplies granted in this Session of Parliament. | The whole act. |
| 46 Geo. 3. c. 2 | Malt Duties Act 1806 | An Act for continuing and granting to His Majesty certain Duties upon Malt in Great Britain, for the Service of the Year One thousand eight hundred and six. | The whole act. |
| 46 Geo. 3. c. 3 | Duties on Pensions, etc. Act 1806 | An Act for continuing and granting to His Majesty a Duty on Pensions, Offices, and Personal Estates in England; and certain Duties on Sugar, Malt, Tobacco, and Snuff in Great Britain, for the Service of the Year One thousand eight hundred and six. | The whole act. |
| 46 Geo. 3. c. 4 | Annuity to Lady Nelson Act 1806 | An Act to enable His Majesty to grant a certain Annuity to Lady Viscountess Nelson, in consideration of the eminent Services performed by the late Vice Admiral Lord Viscount Nelson to His Majesty and the Public. | The whole act. |
| 46 Geo. 3. c. 5 | Annuity to Sir Richard Strachan Act 1806 | An Act to enable His Majesty to grant a certain Annuity to Rear Admiral Sir Richard Strachan, Baronet, in consideration of the eminent Services which he has rendered to His Majesty and the Public. | The whole act. |
| 46 Geo. 3. c. 6 | Loans or Exchequer Bills Act 1806 | An Act for raising the Sum of Five Millions by Loans or Exchequer Bills, for the Service of Great Britain for the Year One thousand eight hundred and six. | The whole act. |
| 46 Geo. 3. c. 8 | Marine Mutiny Act 1806 | An Act for the Regulation of His Majesty's Royal Marine Forces while on Shore. | The whole act. |
| 46 Geo. 3. c. 10 | Drawbacks upon Sugar Act 1806 | An Act the title of which begins with the words,—An Act for further continuing, until the Twenty-fifth Day of March,—and ends with the words,— Drawbacks and Bounties on the Exportation of Sugar from Ireland, and for allowing other Drawbacks and Bounties in lieu thereof. | The whole act. |
| 46 Geo. 3. c. 12 | Duties and Drawbacks (Ireland) Act 1806 | An Act the title of which begins with the words,—An Act to continue several Acts for granting certain Rates and Duties,—and ends with the words,— Twenty-fifth Day of March One thousand eight hundred and seven. | The whole act. |
| 46 Geo. 3. c. 13 | Annuity to Lord Collingwood, etc. Act 1806 | An Act for settling and securing certain Annuities on Cuthbert Lord Collingwood, and the several other Persons therein described, in consideration of the signal and important Service performed by the said Cuthbert Lord Collingwood to His Majesty and the Public. | The whole act. |
| 46 Geo. 3. c. 14 | Drawbacks (Ireland) Act 1806 | An Act to continue, until the Twenty-fifth Day of March One thousand eight hundred and seven, so much of an Act for regulating the Drawbacks and Bounties on the Exportation of Sugar from Ireland. | The whole act. |
| 46 Geo. 3. c. 15 | Mutiny Act 1806 | An Act for punishing Mutiny and Desertion, and for the better Payment of the Army and their Quarters, within the United Kingdom, and the Islands of Jersey, Guernsey, Alderney, Sark, and Man. | The whole act. |
| 46 Geo. 3. c. 16 | Treaty of Commerce, etc., with America Act 1806 | An Act the title of which begins with the words,—An Act to continue, until the First Day of June,—and ends with the words,—Navigation between His Majesty and the United States of America. | The whole act. |
| 46 Geo. 3. c. 17 | Exportation (No. 2) Act 1806 | An Act to permit, until the Twenty-fifth Day of March One thousand eight hundred and seven, the Importation of Swedish Herrings into Great Britain. | The whole act. |
| 46 Geo. 3. c. 18 | Woollen Manufacture Act 1806 | An Act the title of which begins with the words,—An Act to continue, until the Twenty-fifth Day of March,—and ends with the words,—Persons employed or concerned in the said Manufacture. | The whole act. |
| 46 Geo. 3. c. 19 | Militia Pay (Great Britain) Act 1806 | An Act for defraying the Charge of the Pay and Cloathing of the Militia in Great Britain for the Year One thousand eight hundred and six. | The whole act. |
| 46 Geo. 3. c. 20 | Militia Allowances Act 1806 | An Act the title of which begins with the words,—An Act to continue, until the Twenty-fifth Day of March,—and ends with the words,—Militia of England, disembodied under an Act of the same Session of Parliament. | The whole act. |
| 46 Geo. 3. c. 21 | Militia Allowances (No. 2) Act 1806 | An Act for making Allowances in certain Cases to Subaltern Officers of the Militia in Great Britain, while disembodied. | The whole act. |
| 46 Geo. 3. c. 22 | Militia Pay (Ireland) Act 1806 | An Act the title of which begins with the words,—An Act for defraying, until the Twenty-fifth Day of March,—and ends with the words,—Allowances in certain Cases to Subaltern Officers of the said Militia during Peace. | The whole act. |
| 46 Geo. 3. c. 23 | Enlistment of Foreigners Act 1806 | An Act to extend the Provisions of an Act passed in the Forty-fourth Year of the Reign of His present Majesty, for enabling Subjects of Foreign States to enlist as Soldiers in His Majesty's Service; and to indemnify those who have advised His Majesty to land such Soldiers in this Kingdom. | The whole act. |
| 46 Geo. 3. c. 24 | Payment of Creditors (Scotland) Act 1806 | An Act for further continuing, until the Twenty-fifth Day of March One thousand eight hundred and seven, an Act made in the Thirty-third year of the Reign of His present Majesty, for rendering the Payment of Creditors more equal and expeditious in Scotland. | The whole act. |
| 46 Geo. 3. c. 25 | Loans or Exchequer Bills (No. 2) Act 1806 | An Act for raising the Sum of Ten millions five hundred thousand Pounds, by Loans or Exchequer Bills, for the Service of Great Britain for the Year One thousand eight hundred and six. | The whole act. |
| 46 Geo. 3. c. 26 | Loans or Exchequer Bills (No. 3) Act 1806 | An Act for raising the Sum of One million five hundred thousand Pounds, by Loans or Exchequer Bills, for the Service of Great Britain for the Year One thousand eight hundred and six. | The whole act. |
| 46 Geo. 3. c. 27 | Bonding of Spirits Act 1806 | An Act the title of which begins with the words,—An Act for continuing, until the Twenty-fifth Day of March,—and ends with the words,—Spirits of the British Sugar Plantations below Proof, and of the Duties of Excise. | The whole act. |
| 46 Geo. 3. c. 28 | Transportation, etc. Act 1806 | An Act to continue, until the Twenty-fifth Day of March One thousand eight hundred and seven, an Act made relating to the Transportation of Felons and other Offenders to temporary Places of Confinement in England and Scotland. | The whole act. |
| 46 Geo. 3. c. 29 | Continuance of Laws Act 1806 | An Act the title of which begins with the words,—An Act for reviving and continuing several Laws of Customs,—and ends with the words,—Twenty-fifth Day of March One thousand eight hundred and nine. | The whole act. |
| 46 Geo. 3. c. 30 | Cape of Good Hope Trade Act 1806 | An Act to authorize His Majesty, until the Twenty-fifth Day of March One thousand eight hundred and seven, to make Regulations respecting the Trade and Commerce to and from the Cape of Good Hope. | The whole act. |
| 46 Geo. 3. c. 31 | Militia (Ireland) Act 1806 | An Act the title of which begins with the words,—An Act to continue, until the Twenty-fifth Day of March,—and ends with the words,—Militia Forces in Ireland as might voluntarily offer themselves to be employed in Great Britain. | The whole act. |
| 46 Geo. 3. c. 32 | Treasury Bills (Ireland) Act 1806 | An Act the title of which begins with the words,—An Act to enable the Commissioners of His Majesty's Treasury of Ireland,—and ends with the words,—making forth Duplicates of Treasury Bills lost or destroyed. | The whole act. |
| 46 Geo. 3. c. 36 | Duty on Houses Act 1806 | An Act to repeal so much of an Act of the last Session of Parliament, as charges a Duty of Three Shillings upon certain Tenements or Dwelling Houses in Ireland. | The whole act. |
| 46 Geo. 3. c. 39 | Excise Act 1806 | An Act for granting to His Majesty, until Twelve Months after the Ratification of a Definitive Treaty of Peace, additional Duties of Excise on Tobacco and Snuff. | The whole act. |
| 46 Geo. 3. c. 40 | Annuity to Admiral Duckworth Act 1806 | An Act to enable His Majesty to grant a certain Annuity to Vice Admiral Sir John Thomas Duckworth, Knight of the most Honourable Order of the Bath, in consideration of the eminent Services which he has rendered to His Majesty and the Public. | The whole act. |
| 46 Geo. 3. c. 41 | Loans or Exchequer Bills (No. 4) Act 1806 | An Act for raising the Sum of Three Millions by Loans or Exchequer Bills, for the Service of Great Britain for the Year One thousand eight hundred and six. | The whole act. |
| 46 Geo. 3. c. 42 | Duties on Certain Goods Act 1806 | An Act the title of which begins with the words,—An Act for granting to His Majesty during the present War,—and ends with the words,—exported from, or brought or carried Coastwise within Great Britain. | The whole act. |
| 46 Geo. 3. c. 46 | Treasury Bills (Ireland) (No. 2) Act 1806 | An Act for raising the Sum of Five hundred thousand Pounds by Treasury Bills, for the Service of Ireland, for the Year One thousand eight hundred and six. | The whole act. |
| 46 Geo. 3. c. 48 | Mutiny (No. 2) Act 1806 | An Act for continuing an Act made in this Session of Parliament, intituled An Act for punishing Mutiny and Desertion, and for the better Payment of the Army and their Quarters, within the United Kingdom, and the Islands of Jersey, Guernsey, Alderney, Sark, and Man. | The whole act. |
| 46 Geo. 3. c. 49 | Salaries of Judges (Scotland) Act 1806 | An Act for increasing the Salaries of the Judges of the Court of Admiralty in Scotland, and of the Judges of the Commissary Court in Edinburgh. | The whole act. |
| 46 Geo. 3. c. 51 | Defence of the Realm Act 1806 | An Act to repeal several Acts passed in the Forty-third and Forty-fourth Years respectively of His present Majesty's Reign, for raising and establishing a Force for the Defence of the Realm. | The whole act. |
| 46 Geo. 3. c. 53 | Importation, etc. Act 1806 | An Act for indemnifying Governors, Lieutenant Governors, and Persons acting as such, in all Parts of His Majesty's Dominions abroad, who have been concerned in advising,—and ends with the words,—Territories which have been conquered by His Majesty's Arms. | The whole act. |
| 46 Geo. 3. c. 56 | Duties on Spirits (Ireland) Act 1806 | An Act to amend an Act of the last Session of Parliament for continuing and amending several Acts for regulating and securing the Collection of the Duties on Spirituous Liquors distilled in Ireland, and the Warehousing of such Spirits for Exportation. | The whole act. |
| 46 Geo. 3. c. 58 | Customs and Excise (Ireland) Act 1806 | An Act for establishing certain Regulations in the Collection and Management of His Majesty's Revenues of Customs, Excise, and Taxes in Ireland. | The whole act. |
| 46 Geo. 3. c. 62 | Duties and Drawbacks (Ireland) (No. 2) Act 1806 | An Act for granting to His Majesty, until the Twenty-ninth Day of September One thousand eight hundred and six, certain Duties on the Importation, and to allow certain Drawbacks and Bounties on the Exportation of certain Sorts of Iron, Sugar, and Tea into and from Ireland. | The whole act. |
| 46 Geo. 3. c. 63 | Defence of the Realm (Ireland) Act 1806 | An Act to repeal several Acts passed in the Forty-third and Forty-fourth Years of His present Majesty, for raising and establishing an additional Force in the Defence of the Realm. | The whole act. |
| 46 Geo. 3. c. 65 | Income Tax Act 1806 | An Act the title of which begins with the words,—An Act for granting to His Majesty, during the present War,—and ends with the words,—and to consolidate and render more effectual the Provisions for collecting the said Duties. | The whole act. |
| 46 Geo. 3. c. 66 | Mutiny (No. 3) Act 1806 | An Act for punishing Mutiny and Desertion, and for the better Payment of the Army and their Quarters. | The whole act. |
| 46 Geo. 3. c. 67 | Malt and Spirit Duties (Ireland) Act 1806 | An Act for granting to His Majesty certain Duties upon Malt and Spirits made in Ireland. | The whole act. |
| 46 Geo. 3. c. 76 | Receiver General of Stamps Act 1806 | An Act for the better Regulation of the Office of Receiver General of the Stamp Duties in England. | The whole act. |
| 46 Geo. 3. c. 77 | Discovery of Longitude at Sea, etc. Act 1806 | An Act the title of which begins with the words,—An Act for continuing the Encouragement of Persons making Discoveries,—and ends with the words,—Longitudes in carrying the Acts relating thereto into execution. | The whole act. |
| 46 Geo. 3. c. 80 | West Indies Act 1806 | An Act to provide for the more speedy Examination of Accounts of the Expenditure of the Public Money in the West Indies, and for the better Discovery of Frauds and Abuses therein. | The whole act. |
| 46 Geo. 3. c. 81 | Thread Lace Manufacture (England) Act 1806 | An Act for better encouraging the Manufacture of Thread Lace in Great Britain. | The whole act. |
| 46 Geo. 3. c. 85 | East India Company Act 1806 | An Act the title of which begins with the words,—An Act for reviving and continuing, until the Twenty-fifth Day of March,—and ends with the words,—East Indies shall hire and take up Ships for their regular Service. | The whole act. |
| 46 Geo. 3. c. 90 | Defence of the Realm (No. 2) Act 1806 | An Act to enable His Majesty to accept the Services of a Proportion of His Subjects in England, under certain Regulations, and more effectually to provide for the Defence of the Realm | Except Section Forty-six. |
| 46 Geo. 3. c. 91 | Militia Act 1806 | An Act for the Return of correct Lists of Persons liable to serve in the Militia under an Act passed in the Forty-second Year of His present Majesty's Reign, and to suspend the Ballot for the Militia for Two Years. | The whole act. |
| 46 Geo. 3. c. 93 | Exchequer Bills Act 1806 | An Act to enable the Lords Commissioners of His Majesty's Treasury to issue Exchequer Bills, on the Credit of such Aids or Supplies as have been or shall be granted by Parliament for the Service of Great Britain, for the Year One thousand eight hundred and six. | The whole act. |
| 46 Geo. 3. c. 94 | Duties of Prisage and Butlerage (Ireland) Act 1806 | An Act to enable the Commissioners for executing the Office of Lord High Treasurer of Ireland, to contract for the Purchase of the Duties of Prisage and Butlerage in Ireland. | The whole act. |
| 46 Geo. 3. c. 95 | Hospitals and Infirmaries (Ireland) Act 1806 | An Act for the more effectually regulating and providing for the Relief of the Poor, and the Management of Infirmaries and Hospitals in Ireland. | The whole act. |
| 46 Geo. 3. c. 96 | Highways (Ireland) Act 1806 | An Act to amend the Laws now in force for raising Money presented in Ireland for the making, repairing, widening, or fencing of Public Roads, and for the building or repairing of Bridges, Pipes, and Gullets. | The whole act. |
| 46 Geo. 3. c. 98 | Quarantine (Great Britain) Act 1806 | An Act for making additional and further Provisions for the effectual Performance of Quarantine in Great Britain. | The whole act. |
| 46 Geo. 3. c. 103 | Importation (No. 2) Act 1806 | An Act for allowing, until the First Day of August One thousand eight hundred and seven, the Importation of certain Fish from Newfoundland, and the Coast of Labrador, and for granting a Bounty thereon. | The whole act. |
| 46 Geo. 3. c. 106 | Revenue (Ireland) Act 1806 | An Act to provide for the better Execution of the several Acts relating to the Revenues, Matters, and Things under the Management of the Commissioners of Customs and Port Duties, and of the Commissioners of Inland Excise and Taxes in Ireland | Except Section Thirteen. |
| 46 Geo. 3. c. 107 | Land Tax, etc. Act 1806 | An Act the title of which begins with the words,—An Act for rectifying Mistakes in the Names of the Commissioners,—and ends with the words,— indemnifying such Persons as have acted as Commissioners for executing the said Acts. | The whole act. |
| 46 Geo. 3. c. 108 | Insolvent Debtors Relief Act 1806 | An Act for the Relief of certain Insolvent Debtors. | The whole act. |
| 46 Geo. 3. c. 111 | Neutral Ships Act 1806 | An Act the title of which begins with the words,—An Act for authorizing His Majesty in Council,—and ends with the words,—His Majesty's Territories in the West Indies and Continent of South America. | The whole act. |
| 46 Geo. 3. c. 112 | Excise (No. 3) Act 1806 | An Act to amend the Laws of Excise, so far as relates to Prosecutions for Penalties, to the counterfeiting the Stamps on the Wrappers of Paper, and to the publishing Persons guilty of Forgery. | The whole act. |
| 46 Geo. 3. c. 113 | Importation (No. 3) Act 1806 | An Act to permit for and during the Continuance of the present War, French Wines to be imported from Ireland into Great Britain in Bottles or Flasks, without incurring any Penalties. | The whole act. |
| 46 Geo. 3. c. 117 | Importation (No. 4) Act 1806 | An Act to permit until the First Day of January One thousand eight hundred and eight, the Importation of Masts, Yards, and Bowsprits, or Timber for Naval Purposes, from the British Colonies in North America, Duty-free. | The whole act. |
| 46 Geo. 3. c. 119 | Slave Trade (No. 2) Act 1806 | An Act the title of which begins with the words,—An Act to prohibit, for Two Years,—and ends with the words,—Ships shall not have been previously employed in the African Trade, or contracted for, for that Purpose. | The whole act. |
| 46 Geo. 3. c. 120 | Duties, Bounties, etc. (Ireland) Act 1806 | An Act the title of which begins with the words,—An Act to continue several Acts for granting certain Rates and Duties,—and ends with the words,—and to amend several of the said Acts. | The whole act. |
| 46 Geo. 3. c. 121 | Importation (No. 5) Act 1806 | An Act to repeal so much of an Act, made in the First Year of King James the Second, as prohibits the Importation of Gunpowder, Arms, and Utensils of War, from Ireland. | The whole act. |
| 46 Geo. 3. c. 122 | Education (Ireland) Act 1806 | An Act to revive and amend an Act made in the Parliament of Ireland, for enabling the Lord Lieutenant to appoint Commissioners for inquiring into the several Funds and Revenues granted for the Purpose of Education, and into the State and Condition of all Schools in Ireland. | The whole act. |
| 46 Geo. 3. c. 125 | Yeomanry, etc. Act 1806 | An Act for better regulating the Office of Officers in Yeomanry and Volunteer Corps. | The whole act. |
| 46 Geo. 3. c. 126 | Quartering of Soldiers Act 1806 | An Act for increasing the Rates of Subsistence to be paid to Innkeepers and others on quartering Soldiers. | The whole act. |
| 46 Geo. 3. c. 133 | Land Tax Redemption Act 1806 | An Act to amend an Act passed in the Forty-second Year of His present Majesty, for consolidating the several Acts passed for the Redemption and Sale of the Land Tax, and to make further Provision for exonerating small Livings and charitable Institutions from the Land Tax. | The whole act. |
| 46 Geo. 3. c. 134 | Highways (Ireland) (No. 2) Act 1806 | An Act to provide for the Security and Expedition of the Conveyance of Letters by the Post in Ireland. | The whole act. |
| 46 Geo. 3. c. 138 | Excise (No. 4) Act 1806 | An Act to repeal Part of the Excise Countervailing Duty on Irish Hops imported; for granting an Excise Countervailing Duty on the Importation of Irish Window Glass; and to exempt Tiles used for the Purpose of draining Lands from the Duties of Excise. | The whole act. |
| 46 Geo. 3. c. 139 | Malt Duties (No. 2) Act 1806 | An Act for altering and amending several Laws relating to the Duties of Excise upon Malt, until the Twenty-fifth Day of March One thousand eight hundred and seven. | The whole act. |
| 46 Geo. 3. c. 144 | Defence of the Realm, London Act 1806 | An Act the title of which begins with the words,—An Act to repeal an Act passed in the Forty-fourth Year,—and ends with the words,—Militia of the City of London. | The whole act. |
| 46 Geo. 3. c. 145 | Annuities to Royal Family Act 1806 | An Act for enabling His Majesty to settle Annuities on certain Branches of the Royal Family. | The whole act. |
| 46 Geo. 3. c. 147 | Annuity to Lord Rodney Act 1806 | An Act for enabling His Majesty to continue a certain Annuity to George now Lord Viscount Torrington, late George Byng Esquire, in consideration of the eminent Services rendered to His Majesty and the Public by the said George Byridge Lord Rodney. | The whole act. |
| 46 Geo. 3. c. 148 | Lotteries Act 1806 | An Act for granting to His Majesty a Sum of Money to be raised by Lotteries | Except Section Fifty-nine so far as it does not relate to penalties inflicted by that Act. |
| 46 Geo. 3. c. 149 | Appropriation Act 1806 | An Act for granting to His Majesty a certain Sum of Money out of the Consolidated Fund of Great Britain for the Year One thousand eight hundred and six; and for further appropriating the Supplies granted in this Session of Parliament. | The whole act. |
| 46 Geo. 3. c. 152 | Actions, etc., for Buying Oak Bark, etc. Act 1806 | An Act the title of which begins with the words,—An Act to stay, until Forty Days after the Commencement of the next Session,—and ends with the words,—buying of Oak Bark and rough Hides and Calves Skins in the Hair. | The whole act. |
| 46 Geo. 3. c. 154 | Court of Exchequer (Scotland) Act 1806 | An Act for taking down the present Building in which the Treasury Chambers and Office of the Court of Exchequer in Scotland were situated, and erecting new Buildings for their Accommodation. | The whole act. |
| 46 Geo. 3. c. 155 | Canals, etc. (Scotland) Act 1806 | An Act for applying certain Balances arising from the forfeited Estates in Scotland, towards making Roads, Harbours, and other Public Works there. | The whole act. |
| 46 Geo. 3. c. 156 | British Fisheries (No. 2) Act 1806 | An Act for appropriating certain Balances arising from the forfeited Estates in Scotland to the Use of the British Fisheries and the erecting a Lunatic Asylum at Edinburgh, and the Payment of the Officers of the late Board of annexed Estates in Scotland. | The whole act. |

== See also ==
- Statute Law Revision Act
