= List of acts of the Parliament of the United Kingdom from 1805 =

This is a complete list of acts of the Parliament of the United Kingdom for the year 1805.

Note that the first parliament of the United Kingdom was held in 1801; parliaments between 1707 and 1800 were either parliaments of Great Britain or of Ireland). For acts passed up until 1707, see the list of acts of the Parliament of England and the list of acts of the Parliament of Scotland. For acts passed from 1707 to 1800, see the list of acts of the Parliament of Great Britain. See also the list of acts of the Parliament of Ireland.

For acts of the devolved parliaments and assemblies in the United Kingdom, see the list of acts of the Scottish Parliament, the list of acts of the Northern Ireland Assembly, and the list of acts and measures of Senedd Cymru; see also the list of acts of the Parliament of Northern Ireland.

The number shown after each act's title is its chapter number. Acts passed before 1963 are cited using this number, preceded by the year(s) of the reign during which the relevant parliamentary session was held; thus the Union with Ireland Act 1800 is cited as "39 & 40 Geo. 3 c. 67", meaning the 67th act passed during the session that started in the 39th year of the reign of George III and which finished in the 40th year of that reign. Note that the modern convention is to use Arabic numerals in citations (thus "41 Geo. 3" rather than "41 Geo. III"). Acts of the last session of the Parliament of Great Britain and the first session of the Parliament of the United Kingdom are both cited as "41 Geo. 3". Acts passed from 1963 onwards are simply cited by calendar year and chapter number.

All modern acts have a short title, e.g. "the Local Government Act 2003". Some earlier acts also have a short title given to them by later acts, such as by the Short Titles Act 1896.

== 45 Geo. 3 ==
The third session of the 2nd Parliament of the United Kingdom, which met from 15 January 1805 until 12 July 1805.

This session was also traditionally cited as 45 G. 3.

=== Public general acts ===
| Short title | Citation | Royal assent |
Long title
| Duties on Malt Act 1805 (repealed) | 45 Geo. 3. c. 1 | 7 February 1805 |
An act for continuing and granting to his Majesty certain duties upon malt, in Great Britain, for the service of the year one thousand eight hundred and five. (Repealed by Statute Law Revision Act 1872 (35 & 36 Vict. c. 63))
| Duties on Pensions, etc. Act 1805 (repealed) | 45 Geo. 3. c. 2 | 7 February 1805 |
An act for continuing and granting to his Majesty a duty on pensions, offices, and personal estates, in England; and certain duties on sugar, malt, tobacco, and snuff, in Great Britain, for the service of the year one thousand eight hundred and five. (Repealed by Statute Law Revision Act 1872 (35 & 36 Vict. c. 63))
| Insolvent Debtors Relief Act 1805 (repealed) | 45 Geo. 3. c. 3 | 7 February 1805 |
An act to remedy certain omissions in an act, passed in the last session of parliament, intituled, "An act for the relief of certain insolvent debtors." (Note: Insolvent Debtors Relief Act 1804 (44 Geo. 3. c. 108)) (Repealed by Statute Law Revision Act 1872 (35 & 36 Vict. c. 63))
| Habeas Corpus Suspension (Ireland) Act 1805 (repealed) | 45 Geo. 3. c. 4 | 22 February 1805 |
An act to continue, until six weeks after the commencement of the next session of parliament, an act, made in the last session of parliament, (Note: Habeas Corpus Suspension (Ireland) Act 1803 (44 Geo. 3. c. 8)) for continuing an act to empower the lord-lieutenant or other chief governor or governors of Ireland, to apprehend and detain such persons as he or they shall suspect for conspiring against his Majesty's person and government. (Repealed by Statute Law Revision Act 1872 (35 & 36 Vict. c. 63))
| Taxation Act 1805 (repealed) | 45 Geo. 3. c. 5 | 22 February 1805 |
An act for explaining and amending an act made in the forty-third year of his present Majesty, (Note: Taxes Act 1803 (43 Geo. 3. c. 99)) for consolidating certain of the provisions contained in any act or acts relating to the duties under the management of the commissioners for the affairs of taxes, and for amending the same, so far as relates to the power of acting as commissioners in certain districts. (Repealed by Statute Law Revision Act 1872 (35 & 36 Vict. c. 63))
| Indemnity Act 1805 (repealed) | 45 Geo. 3. c. 6 | 22 February 1805 |
An act to indemnify such persons in the United Kingdom as have omitted to qualify themselves for offices and employments; and for extending the times limited for those purposes respectively, until this twenty-fifth day of December one thousand eight hundred and five, and to permit such persons in Great Britain as have omitted to make and file affidavits of the execution of indentures of clerks to attornies and solicitors, to make and file the same on or before the first day of term, one thousand eight hundred and five. (Repealed by Promissory Oaths Act 1871 (34 & 35 Vict. c. 48))
| Loans or Exchequer Bills Act 1805 (repealed) | 45 Geo. 3. c. 7 | 22 February 1805 |
An act for raising the sum of three millions by loans or exchequer-bills, for the service of Great Britain, for the year one thousand eight hundred and five. (Repealed by Statute Law Revision Act 1872 (35 & 36 Vict. c. 63))
| National Debt Act 1805 (repealed) | 45 Geo. 3. c. 8 | 1 March 1805 |
An act for amending an act, passed in the last session of parliament, (Note: National Debt (No. 3) Act 1804 (44 Geo. 3. c. 99)) for granting additional annuities to the proprietors of stock created by two acts, passed in the thirty-seventh (Note: National Debt (No. 5) Act 1796 (37 Geo. 3. c. 10)) and forty-second (Note: National Debt Act 1801 (42 Geo. 3. c. 8)) years of his present Majesty. (Repealed by Statute Law Revision Act 1870 (33 & 34 Vict. c. 69))
| Greenland Whale Fishery Act 1805 (repealed) | 45 Geo. 3. c. 9 | 1 March 1805 |
An act for allowing vessels employed in the Greenland whale fishery, to complete their full number of men at certain ports for the present season. (Repealed by Customs Law Repeal Act 1825 (6 Geo. 4. c. 105))
| Quarantine Act 1805 (repealed) | 45 Geo. 3. c. 10 | 1 March 1805 |
An act for making further provision for the effectual performance of quarantine. (Repealed by Statute Law Revision Act 1872 (35 & 36 Vict. c. 63))
| Postage Act 1805 (repealed) | 45 Geo. 3. c. 11 | 12 March 1805 |
An act for granting certain additional rates and duties in Great Britain, on the conveyance of letters. (Repealed by Post Office (Repeal of Laws) Act 1837 (7 Will. 4 & 1 Vict. c. 32))
| National Debt (No. 2) Act 1805 (repealed) | 45 Geo. 3. c. 12 | 12 March 1805 |
An act for raising the sum of twenty-two millions five hundred thousand pounds by way of annuities. (Repealed by Statute Law Revision Act 1870 (33 & 34 Vict. c. 69))
| Assessed Taxes Act 1805 (repealed) | 45 Geo. 3. c. 13 | 18 March 1805 |
An act for granting to his Majesty additional duties in Great Britain on horses used in riding, or for drawing certain carriages; and for consolidating the said additional duties with the present duties thereon. (Repealed by Statute Law Revision Act 1872 (35 & 36 Vict. c. 63))
| Salt Duties Act 1805 (repealed) | 45 Geo. 3. c. 14 | 18 March 1805 |
An act for granting additional duties on salt in Great Britain. (Repealed by Statute Law Revision Act 1861 (24 & 25 Vict. c. 101))
| Income Tax Act 1805 (repealed) | 45 Geo. 3. c. 15 | 18 March 1805 |
An act for granting to his Majesty additional duties in Great Britain, on the amount of assessments to be charged on the profits arising from property, professions, trades, and offices. (Repealed by Statute Law Revision Act 1872 (35 & 36 Vict. c. 63))
| Mutiny Act 1805 (repealed) | 45 Geo. 3. c. 16 | 18 March 1805 |
An act for punishing mutiny and desertion; and for the better payment of the army and their quarters. (Repealed by Statute Law Revision Act 1872 (35 & 36 Vict. c. 63))
| Marine Mutiny Act 1805 (repealed) | 45 Geo. 3. c. 17 | 22 March 1805 |
An act for the regulation of his Majesty's royal marine forces while on shore. (Repealed by Statute Law Revision Act 1872 (35 & 36 Vict. c. 63))
| Customs Act 1805 (repealed) | 45 Geo. 3. c. 18 | 25 March 1805 |
An act for granting to his Majesty, until the twenty-fifth day of March one thousand eight hundred and six, certain rates and duties, and to allow certain drawbacks and bounties upon goods, wares, and merchandize, imported into and exported from Ireland, in lieu of former rates and duties, drawbacks, and bounties. (Repealed by Statute Law Revision Act 1872 (35 & 36 Vict. c. 63))
| Excise and Taxes (Ireland) Act 1805 (repealed) | 45 Geo. 3. c. 19 | 25 March 1805 |
An act for granting to his Majesty, until the twenty-fifth day of March one thousand eight hundred and six, certain inland duties of excise and taxes in Ireland, in lieu of former duties of excise and taxes. (Repealed by Statute Law Revision Act 1872 (35 & 36 Vict. c. 63))
| Stamps (Ireland) Act 1805 (repealed) | 45 Geo. 3. c. 20 | 25 March 1805 |
An act for granting to his Majesty certain stamp-duties in Ireland. (Repealed by Stamps (Ireland) Act 1806 (46 Geo. 3. c. 64))
| Postage (No. 2) Act 1805 (repealed) | 45 Geo. 3. c. 21 | 25 March 1805 |
An act for repealing certain duties upon letters and packets sent by the post within Ireland, and granting other duties in lieu thereof. (Repealed by Post Office (Repeal of Laws) Act 1837 (7 Will. 4 & 1 Vict. c. 32))
| Duties on Malt, etc. Act 1805 (repealed) | 45 Geo. 3. c. 22 | 25 March 1805 |
An act for granting to his Majesty a duty upon malt made in Ireland, and upon spirits made or distilled in Ireland, for the year one thousand eight hundred and five. (Repealed by Statute Law Revision Act 1872 (35 & 36 Vict. c. 63))
| Drawbacks, etc. (Ireland) Act 1805 (repealed) | 45 Geo. 3. c. 23 | 25 March 1805 |
An act to continue, Until the twenty-fifth day of March one thousand eight hundred and six, and to amend several acts for regulating the drawbacks and bounties on the exportation of sugar from Ireland. (Repealed by Statute Law Revision Act 1872 (35 & 36 Vict. c. 63))
| Bounties and Drawbacks Act 1805 (repealed) | 45 Geo. 3. c. 24 | 25 March 1805 |
An act for further continuing, until the twenty-fifth day of March one thousand eight hundred and six, an act, passed in the forty-third year of his present Majesty, (Note: Drawbacks and Bounties Act 1802 (43 Geo. 3. c. 11)) for discontinuing certain drawbacks and bounties on the exportation of sugar from Great Britain, and for allowing other drawbacks and bounties in lieu thereof. (Repealed by Statute Law Revision Act 1872 (35 & 36 Vict. c. 63))
| Negotiations of Notes and Bills Act 1805 (repealed) | 45 Geo. 3. c. 25 | 25 March 1805 |
An act to continue an act (Note: Negotiation of Notes and Bills Act 1797 (37 Geo. 3. c. 32)) for suspending the operation of an act of the seventeenth year of his present Majesty, (Note: Bills of Exchange Act 1776 (17 Geo. 3. c. 30)) for restraining the negociation of promissory notes and bills of exchange under a limited sum in England, until six months after the ratification of a definitive treaty of peace. (Repealed by Statute Law Revision Act 1872 (35 & 36 Vict. c. 63))
| Importation, Exportation, etc. Act 1805 (repealed) | 45 Geo. 3. c. 26 | 25 March 1805 |
An act for continuing several laws relating to the permitting the warehousing of spirits in Ireland for exportation, for charging a duty on the same when taken out for home consumption, and for regulating the exportation to Great Britain of spirits not warehoused, until the twenty-ninth day of September one thousand eight hundred and five; to the prohibiting the exportation from, and permitting the importation to Great Britain of corn, and for allowing the importation of other articles of provision, without payment of duty, and to the prohibiting the exportation from Ireland of corn, or potatoes, or other provisions, and to the permitting the importation into Ireland of corn, fish, and provisions, without payment of duty, until the twenty-fifth day of March one thousand eight hundred and six. (Repealed by Statute Law Revision Act 1872 (35 & 36 Vict. c. 63))
| Exchequer Bills Act 1805 (repealed) | 45 Geo. 3. c. 27 | 25 March 1805 |
An act to enable the lords-commissioners of his Majesty's treasury of Great Britain, to issue exchequer-bills, on the credit of such aids or supplies as have been or shall be granted by parliament for the service of Great Britain, for the year one thousand eight hundred and five. (Repealed by Statute Law Revision Act 1872 (35 & 36 Vict. c. 63))
| Legacy Duty Act 1805 (repealed) | 45 Geo. 3. c. 28 | 5 April 1805 |
An act for granting to his Majesty additional stamp duties in Great Britain on certain legacies. (Repealed by Finance Act 1949 (12, 13 & 14 Geo. 6. c. 47))
| Customs (No. 2) Act 1805 (repealed) | 45 Geo. 3. c. 29 | 5 April 1805 |
An act for granting to his Majesty additional duties within Great Britain on certain goods, wares, and merchandise imported into or brought or carried coastwise. (Repealed by Statute Law Revision Act 1861 (24 & 25 Vict. c. 101))
| Excise Act 1805 (repealed) | 45 Geo. 3. c. 30 | 5 April 1805 |
An act for granting to his Majesty several additional duties of excise in Great Britain. (Repealed by Statute Law Revision Act 1861 (24 & 25 Vict. c. 101))
| Militia (Great Britain) Act 1805 (repealed) | 45 Geo. 3. c. 31 | 10 April 1805 |
An act for allowing a certain proportion of the militia in Great Britain voluntarily to enlist into his Majesty's regular forces and royal marines. (Repealed by Statute Law Revision Act 1872 (35 & 36 Vict. c. 63))
| Foreign Ships, etc. Act 1805 (repealed) | 45 Geo. 3. c. 32 | 10 April 1805 |
An act for granting to foreign ships put under his Majesty's protection the privileges of prize ships under certain regulations and restrictions; and for allowing aliens, in foreign colonies surrendered to his Majesty, to exercise the occupations of merchants or factors during the present war, and until six months after the ratification of a definitive treaty of peace. (Repealed by Statute Law Revision Act 1872 (35 & 36 Vict. c. 63))
| Exportation and Importation Act 1805 (repealed) | 45 Geo. 3. c. 33 | 10 April 1805 |
An act to make valid certain licences granted by virtue of an order in council for allowing the importation and exportation of certain goods, and merchandize from and to Spain in neutral vessels; and for indemnifying all persons concerned in advising such order, or granting or acting under such licences. (Repealed by Statute Law Revision Act 1872 (35 & 36 Vict. c. 63))
| Importation Act 1805 (repealed) | 45 Geo. 3. c. 34 | 10 April 1805 |
An act to permit the importation of goods and commodities from countries in America belonging to any foreign European sovereign or date in neutral ships, during the present war, and until six months after the Ratification of a definitive treaty of peace. (Repealed by Statute Law Revision Act 1872 (35 & 36 Vict. c. 63))
| Treaty of Commerce, etc., with America Act 1805 (repealed) | 45 Geo. 3. c. 35 | 10 April 1805 |
An act to continue, until the first day of one thousand eight hundred and six, and amend an act, passed in the thirty-seventh year of his present Majesty's reign, (Note: Treaty with United States Act 1797 (37 Geo. 3. c. 97)) for carrying into execution the treaty of amity, commerce, and navigation between his Majesty and the United States of America. (Repealed by Statute Law Revision Act 1872 (35 & 36 Vict. c. 63))
| Forces of East India Company Act 1805 (repealed) | 45 Geo. 3. c. 36 | 10 April 1805 |
An act to enable the East India Company to appoint the commander in chief on the Bengal establishment to be a member of the council of Fort William in Bengal, notwithstanding the office of governor-general of Fort William, and the office of commander in chief of all the forces in India, being vested in the same person. (Repealed by Statute Law Revision Act 1872 (35 & 36 Vict. c. 63))
| Quartering of Soldiers Act 1805 (repealed) | 45 Geo. 3. c. 37 | 10 April 1805 |
An act for increasing the rates of subsistence to be paid to innkeepers and others on quartering soldiers. (Repealed by Statute Law Revision Act 1872 (35 & 36 Vict. c. 63))
| Irish Militia Act 1805 (repealed) | 45 Geo. 3. c. 38 | 11 April 1805 |
An act for allowing a certain proportion of the militia in Ireland voluntarily to enlist into his Majesty's forces and royal marines. (Repealed by Statute Law Revision Act 1872 (35 & 36 Vict. c. 63))
| Spirits Act 1805 (repealed) | 45 Geo. 3. c. 39 | 11 April 1805 |
An act to continue, until the twenty-ninth day of September one thousand eight hundred and five, and amend an act, made in the parliament of Ireland in the fortieth year of his present Majesty, (Note: Exciseable Goods Permits Act 1800 (40 Geo. 3. c. 68 (I))) for better regulating the issuing and granting of permits and certificates for the conveyance and protection of certain exciseable goods therein mentioned; and to prevent frauds by dealers in or retailers of such goods; so far as the same respects permits for spirits or spirituous liquors. (Repealed by Permits, etc. (Ireland) Act 1819 (59 Geo. 3. c. 107))
| National Debt (No. 3) Act 1805 (repealed) | 45 Geo. 3. c. 40 | 17 May 1805 |
An act for raising the sum of one million five hundred thousand pounds by way of annuities for the service of Ireland. (Repealed by Statute Law Revision Act 1870 (33 & 34 Vict. c. 69))
| Promissory Notes, etc. (Ireland) Act 1805 (repealed) | 45 Geo. 3. c. 41 | 17 May 1805 |
An act for restraining the negotiation of certain promissory notes and inland bills of exchange in Ireland. (Repealed by Statute Law Revision Act 1872 (35 & 36 Vict. c. 63))
| Counterfeiting Bank of Ireland Silver Tokens, etc. Act 1805 (repealed) | 45 Geo. 3. c. 42 | 17 May 1805 |
An act to extend the provisions of an act made in the last session of parliament (Note: Counterfeit Dollars and Tokens Act 1804 (44 Geo. 3. c. 71)) for preventing the counterfeiting of certain silver coin issued by the banks of England and Ireland respectively, to silver pieces, which may be issued by the governor and company of the bank of Ireland, called Tokens, and to promote the circulation of the said Tokens. (Repealed by Statute Law Revision Act 1861 (24 & 25 Vict. c. 101))
| Highways (Ireland) Act 1805 (repealed) | 45 Geo. 3. c. 43 | 17 May 1805 |
An act to amend the laws for improving and keeping in repair the post-roads in Ireland, and for rendering the conveyance of letters by his Majesty's post-office more secure and expeditious. (Repealed by Statute Law Revision Act 1872 (35 & 36 Vict. c. 63))
| Customs (No. 3) Act 1805 (repealed) | 45 Geo. 3. c. 44 | 5 June 1805 |
An act for repealing so much of an act made in the thirty-fourth year of his present Majesty, (Note: Customs Act 1803 (43 Geo. 3. c. 68)) as exempts slate, the value whereof shall not exceed twenty shillings per ton, brought coastwise within Great Britain, from the duty thereby granted. (Repealed by Statute Law Revision Act 1861 (24 & 25 Vict. c. 101))
| Customs (No. 4) Act 1805 (repealed) | 45 Geo. 3. c. 45 | 5 June 1805 |
An act for making perpetual certain additional duties of excise on wine imported into Great Britain, granted by two acts passed in the forty-third (Note: Excise (No. 2) Act 1803 (43 Geo. 3. c. 81)) and forty-fourth (Note: Excise Act 1804 (44 Geo. 3. c. 49)) years of his present Majesty, and to allow a drawback of the said duties to admirals, captains, and other commissioned officers for wine contained on board his Majesty's ships of war. (Repealed by Statute Law Revision Act 1861 (24 & 25 Vict. c. 101))
| Inquiry into Naval Departments Act 1805 (repealed) | 45 Geo. 3. c. 46 | 5 June 1805 |
An act to continue until the end of the next session of parliament, and amend an act made in the forty-third year of his present Majesty, (Note: Inquiry into Certain Frauds and Abuses Act 1802 (43 Geo. 3. c. 16)) for appointing commissioners to inquire and examine into any irregularities, frauds, or abuses which are or have been practised by persons employed in the several naval departments therein mentioned. (Repealed by Statute Law Revision Act 1872 (35 & 36 Vict. c. 63))
| Inquiry into Military Departments Act 1805 (repealed) | 45 Geo. 3. c. 47 | 5 June 1805 |
An act to appoint commissioners to inquire and examine into the publick expenditure, and the conduct of publick business, in the military departments therein mentioned; and to report such observations as shall occur to them for correcting or preventing any abuses and irregularities, and for the better concluding and managing the business of the said departments; to continue in force for two years, and from thence until the expiration of six weeks after the commencement of the then next session of parliament. (Repealed by Statute Law Revision Act 1872 (35 & 36 Vict. c. 63))
| Land Tax Act 1805 (repealed) | 45 Geo. 3. c. 48 | 5 June 1805 |
An act for appointing commissioners for putting into execution an act of this session of parliament, (Note: Duties on Pensions, etc. Act 1805 (45 Geo. 3. c. 2)) for continuing and granting to his Majesty a duty on pensions, offices, and personal estates, in England, and certain duties on sugar, malt, tobacco, and snuff, in Great Britain, for the service of the year one thousand eight hundred and five; and an act made in the thirty-eighth year of his present Majesty, (Note: Land Tax Act 1797 (38 Geo. 3. c. 5)) for granting an aid to his Majesty by a land-tax, to be raised in Great Britain, for the service of the year one thousand seven hundred and ninety-eight. (Repealed by Statute Law Revision Act 1872 (35 & 36 Vict. c. 63))
| Income Tax (No. 2) Act 1805 or the Income Tax Act 1805 (repealed) | 45 Geo. 3. c. 49 | 5 June 1805 |
An act to repeal certain parts of an act, made in the forty-third year of his present Majesty, (Note: Income Tax Act 1803 (43 Geo. 3. c. 122)) for granting contributions on the profits arising from property, professions, trades, and offices; and to consolidate and render more effectual, the provisions for collecting the said duties. (Repealed by Income Tax Act 1806 (46 Geo. 3. c. 65))
| Sale of Spirituous Liquors Act 1805 (repealed) | 45 Geo. 3. c. 50 | 5 June 1805 |
An act for regulating licences for the sale of spirituous liquors, wine, beer, ale, and cyder, by retail, and for discouraging the immoderate use of spirituous liquors in Ireland. (Repealed by Intoxicating Liquors (Ireland) Act 1815 (55 Geo. 3. c. 19) and Licensed Grocers (Ireland) Act 1818 (58 Geo. 3. c. 57))
| Stamps (Ireland) (No. 2) Act 1805 (repealed) | 45 Geo. 3. c. 51 | 27 June 1805 |
An act for granting to his Majesty certain additional stamp-duties, for amending the laws relating to the stamp-duties, and for indemnifying persons who have acted as notaries-publick without being duly licensed in Ireland. (Repealed by Stamps (Ireland) Act 1806 (46 Geo. 3. c. 64))
| Dealers in Excisable Articles Act 1805 (repealed) | 45 Geo. 3. c. 52 | 27 June 1805 |
An act for the better regulation of licences to persons in Ireland dealing in exciseable commodities, and engaged in the several occupations therein-mentioned. (Repealed by Excise (Ireland) Act 1807 (47 Geo. 3 Sess. 1. c. 35))
| Collection of Malt Duties, etc. Act 1805 (repealed) | 45 Geo. 3. c. 53 | 27 June 1805 |
An act for the collection of the malt-duties in Ireland, and regulating the trade of a maltster. (Repealed by Statute Law Revision Act 1861 (24 & 25 Vict. c. 101))
| Poor Act 1805 (repealed) | 45 Geo. 3. c. 54 | 27 June 1805 |
An act to amend an act, made in the ninth year of King George the First, for amending the laws relating to the settlement, employment, and relief of the poor, so far as the same respects contracts to be entered into for the maintenance and employment of the poor. (Repealed by Poor Law Amendment Act 1834 (4 & 5 Will. 4. c. 76))
| Audit of Public Accounts Act 1805 (repealed) | 45 Geo. 3. c. 55 | 27 June 1805 |
An act to amend an act, made in the twenty-fifth year of his present Majesty, (Note: Audit of Public Accounts Act 1785 (25 Geo. 3. c. 52)) for better examining and auditing the publick accounts of this kingdom, and for enabling the commissioners, in certain cases, to allow of vouchers although not stamped according to law. (Repealed by Exchequer and Audit Departments Act 1866 (29 & 30 Vict. c. 39))
| Post Horse Duties Act 1805 (repealed) | 45 Geo. 3. c. 56 | 27 June 1805 |
An act for further continuing, until the first day of February one thousand eight hundred and nine, an act, made in the twenty-seventh year of his present Majesty, (Note: Post Horse Duties Act 1787 (27 Geo. 3. c. 26)) for enabling the commissioners of the Treasury to let to farm the duties on horses let to hire for travelling post, and by time. (Repealed by Statute Law Revision Act 1872 (35 & 36 Vict. c. 63))
| Importation and Exportation Act 1805 (repealed) | 45 Geo. 3. c. 57 | 27 June 1805 |
An act to consolidate and extend the several laws now in force, for allowing the importation and exportation of certain goods and merchandize into and from certain ports in the West Indies. (Repealed by Trade Act 1822 (3 Geo. 4. c. 44))
| Office of Paymaster General Act 1805 (repealed) | 45 Geo. 3. c. 58 | 27 June 1805 |
An act to repeal an act, made in the twenty-third year of his present Majesty, (Note: Paymaster-General Act 1783 (23 Geo. 3. c. 50)) for the better regulation of the office of paymaster-general of his Majesty's forces, and the more regular payment of the army; and for the more effectually regulating the said office. (Repealed by Statute Law Revision Act 1872 (35 & 36 Vict. c. 63))
| Parliamentary Elections (Ireland) Act 1805 (repealed) | 45 Geo. 3. c. 59 | 27 June 1805 |
An act for amending an act, passed in the parliament of Ireland in the thirty-fifth year of his present Majesty, (Note: Parliamentary Elections Act 1795 (35 Geo. 3. c. 29 (I))) for regulating the election of members to serve in parliament, so far as relates to freeholds under the yearly value or twenty pounds; and for making further and other regulations relating thereto. (Repealed by Statute Law Revision Act 1872 (35 & 36 Vict. c. 63))
| Militia Allowances Act 1805 (repealed) | 45 Geo. 3. c. 60 | 27 June 1805 |
An act for making allowances in certain cases to subaltern officers of the militia in Great Britain, while disembodied. (Repealed by Statute Law Revision Act 1872 (35 & 36 Vict. c. 63))
| Militia Allowances (No. 2) Act 1805 (repealed) | 45 Geo. 3. c. 61 | 27 June 1805 |
An act to revive and further continue, until the twenty-fifth day of March one thousand eight hundred and six, and amend so much of an act, made in the thirty-ninth and fortieth years of his present Majesty (Note: Militia Allowances Act 1800 (39 & 40 Geo. 3. c. 44)) as grants certain allowances to adjutants and serjeant-majors of the militia of disembodied under an act of the same session of parliament. (Repealed by Statute Law Revision Act 1872 (35 & 36 Vict. c. 63))
| Militia Pay (Great Britain) Act 1805 (repealed) | 45 Geo. 3. c. 62 | 27 June 1805 |
An act for defraying the charge of the pay and cloathing of the militia in Great Britain for the year one thousand eight hundred and five. (Repealed by Statute Law Revision Act 1872 (35 & 36 Vict. c. 63))
| Militia Pay (Ireland) Act 1805 (repealed) | 45 Geo. 3. c. 63 | 27 June 1805 |
An act for defraying, until the twenty-fifth day of March one thousand eight hundred and six, the charge of the pay and cloathing of the militia of Ireland, for holding courts-martial on serjeant-majors, serjeants, corporals, and drummers, for offences committed during the time such militia shall not be embodied; and for making allowances in certain cases to subaltern officers of the said militia during peace. (Repealed by Statute Law Revision Act 1872 (35 & 36 Vict. c. 63))
| Harbours (Ireland) Act 1805 (repealed) | 45 Geo. 3. c. 64 | 27 June 1805 |
An act to amend an act made in the forty-first year of his present Majesty (Note: Fish Act 1801 (41 Geo. 3. (U.K.) c. 99)) for granting bounties for taking and bringing fish to the cities of London and Westminster, and other places in the United Kingdom. (Repealed by Statute Law Revision Act 1872 (35 & 36 Vict. c. 63))
| Inquiry into Public Offices (Ireland) Act 1805 (repealed) | 45 Geo. 3. c. 65 | 27 June 1805 |
An act to continue until the twenty-ninth day of September one thousand eight hundred and six, and from thence until the end of the then next session of parliament, an act made in the last session of parliament (Note: Collection of Revenue (Ireland) Act 1804 (44 Geo. 3. c. 105)) for appointing commissioners to inquire into the fees, gratuities, perquisites, and emoluments, which are or have been lately received in the several publick offices in Ireland, therein-mentioned; to examine into any abuses which may exist in the same; and into the present mode of receiving, collecting, issuing, and accounting for publick money in Ireland. (Repealed by Statute Law Revision Act 1872 (35 & 36 Vict. c. 63))
| Preservation of Timber Trees, etc. Act 1805 (repealed) | 45 Geo. 3. c. 66 | 27 June 1805 |
An act to prevent in Great Britain the illegally carrying away bark; and for amending two acts, passed in the sixth (Note: Cultivation, etc., of Trees Act 1766 (6 Geo. 3. c. 36)) and ninth (Note: Customs, etc. (No. 2) Act 1769 (9 Geo. 3. c. 41)) years of his present Majesty's reign for the preservation of timber trees, underwoods, roots, shrubs, plants, hollies, thorns, and quicksets. (Repealed by Statute Law Revision Act 1872 (35 & 36 Vict. c. 63))
| Duties on Spanish Red Wine Act 1805 (repealed) | 45 Geo. 3. c. 67 | 27 June 1805 |
An act for granting to his Majesty an additional duty on Spanish red wine imported into Great Britain. (Repealed by Statute Law Revision Act 1861 (24 & 25 Vict. c. 101))
| Sailcloth Manufacture, etc. Act 1805 (repealed) | 45 Geo. 3. c. 68 | 27 June 1805 |
An act for making perpetual and amending several laws for encouraging the making of sail cloth in Great Britain, and securing the duties on foreign sail cloth imported; and for making perpetual several laws for permitting the exportation of a certain quantity of corn and grain to Guernsey, Jersey, and Alderney; and for regulating the fees of officers of the customs, and of naval officers in the British colonies in America, and of the officers of the customs in Newfoundland. (Repealed by Statute Law Revision Act 1872 (35 & 36 Vict. c. 63))
| Estates Held for the Barrack Service Act 1805 (repealed) | 45 Geo. 3. c. 69 | 27 June 1805 |
An act for vesting in the barrack-master-general for the time being, estates, held or occupied for the barrack-service; and authorising him to sell the same, with the consent of the lords-commissioners of his Majesty's treasury. (Repealed by Statute Law Revision Act 1872 (35 & 36 Vict. c. 63))
| Inquiry into Public Expenditure Act 1805 (repealed) | 45 Geo. 3. c. 70 | 27 June 1805 |
An act to rectify a mistake in the name of one of the commissioners appointed by an act, passed in the present session of parliament, (Note: Inquiry into Military Departments Act 1805 (45 Geo. 3. c. 47)) for appointing commissioners to inquire into the publick expenditure, and the conduct of publick business, in the military departments therein-mentioned. (Repealed by Statute Law Revision Act 1872 (35 & 36 Vict. c. 63))
| Taxes Act 1805 (repealed) | 45 Geo. 3. c. 71 | 27 June 1805 |
An act to amend the several laws relating to the duties under the management of the commissioners for the affairs of taxes. (Repealed by Taxes Management Act 1880 (43 & 44 Vict. c. 19))
| Manning of the Navy Act 1805 (repealed) | 45 Geo. 3. c. 72 | 27 June 1805 |
An act for the encouragement of seamen, and for the better and more effectually manning his Majesty's navy during the present war. (Repealed by Naval Prize Acts Repeal Act 1864 (27 & 28 Vict. c. 23))
| National Debt (No. 4) Act 1805 (repealed) | 45 Geo. 3. c. 73 | 27 June 1805 |
An act to enable the commissioners of the treasury to contract with certain proprietors of stock created by two acts, passed in the thirty-seventh and forty-second years of his present Majesty, for granting other annuities in lieu thereof, or to pay the same off at the period herein-mentioned. (Repealed by Statute Law Revision Act 1870 (33 & 34 Vict. c. 69))
| Lotteries Act 1805 (repealed) | 45 Geo. 3. c. 74 | 27 June 1805 |
An act for granting to his Majesty a sum of money to be raised by lotteries. (Repealed by Statute Law Revision Act 1872 (35 & 36 Vict. c. 63))
| Offices in the Court of Chancery Act 1805 (repealed) | 45 Geo. 3. c. 75 | 27 June 1805 |
An act to remove doubts touching appointments to certain offices in the court of chancery made during the vacancy of the office of register and keeper of the register and registers in that court. (Repealed by Statute Law Revision Act 1861 (24 & 25 Vict. c. 101))
| Civil List (Ireland) Act 1805 (repealed) | 45 Geo. 3. c. 76 | 2 July 1805 |
An act to amend an act made in the parliament of Ireland, (Note: Civil List Act 1793 (33 Geo. 3. c. 32 (I))) for the support of the honour and dignity of his Majesty's crown in Ireland; and for granting to his Majesty a civil list establishment under certain provisions and regulations. (Repealed by Statute Law Revision Act 1872 (35 & 36 Vict. c. 63))
| Land Tax Redemption Act 1805 (repealed) | 45 Geo. 3. c. 77 | 2 July 1805 |
An act to amend and render more effectual an act passed in the forty-second year of his present Majesty's reign, (Note: Land Tax Redemption Act 1802 (42 Geo. 3. c. 116)) for consolidating the provisions of the several acts passed for the redemption and sale of the land-tax into one act. (Repealed by Finance Act 1963 (c. 25))
| Advance to Boyd, Benfield and Company Act 1805 (repealed) | 45 Geo. 3. c. 78 | 2 July 1805 |
An act to indemnify all persons concerned in advancing forty thousand pounds to Messieurs Boyd, Benfield, and company, in one thousand seven hundred and ninety-six, out of the monies issued for naval services. (Repealed by Statute Law Revision Act 1872 (35 & 36 Vict. c. 63))
| Losses During Rebellion in Ireland Act 1805 (repealed) | 45 Geo. 3. c. 79 | 2 July 1805 |
An act to amend several acts, passed in the parliament of Ireland, for appointing commissioners to inquire into the losses of such of his Majesty's loyal subjects as have suffered in their property during the rebellion in Ireland, and for other purposes in the said acts mentioned. (Repealed by Statute Law Revision Act 1872 (35 & 36 Vict. c. 63))
| Continuance of Laws Act 1805 (repealed) | 45 Geo. 3. c. 80 | 2 July 1805 |
An act for continuing several laws relating to the regulating the prices at which corn and grain may be exported from Great Britain to Ireland, and, from Ireland to Great Britain, and to the admission to entry of oil and blubber of Newfoundland, taken by his Majesty's subjects carrying on the fishery from and residing in the said island, until the twenty-fifth day of March one thousand eight hundred and six; and for reviving, amending, and continuing, for the same term, an act of the last session of parliament (Note: Importation Act 1804 (44 Geo. 3. c. 29)) for permitting the importation of hides, and other articles in foreign ships. (Repealed by Statute Law Revision Act 1872 (35 & 36 Vict. c. 63))
| Coasting Trade Act 1805 (repealed) | 45 Geo. 3. c. 81 | 2 July 1805 |
An act to amend an act made in the thirty-first year of his present Majesty, for the better regulation and government of seamen employed in the coasting trade. (Repealed by Merchant Seamen Act 1835 (5 & 6 Will. 4. c. 19))
| Duty on Woollen Goods Act 1805 (repealed) | 45 Geo. 3. c. 82 | 2 July 1805 |
An act for repealing the duty chargeable on woollen goods of the manufacture of Great Britain exported to the East Indies. (Repealed by Statute Law Revision Act 1872 (35 & 36 Vict. c. 63))
| Woollen Manufacture Act 1805 (repealed) | 45 Geo. 3. c. 83 | 2 July 1805 |
An act to continue the operation of an act, passed in the last session of parliament (Note: Woollen Manufacture Act 1804 (44 Geo. 3. c. 64)) to suspend proceedings in actions, prosecutions, and proceedings, under certain acts relating to the woollen manufacture, and also under an act of the reign of Queen Elizabeth (Note: Statute of Artificers 1562 (5 Eliz. 1. c. 4)) so far as the same relates to certain persons employed or concerned in the said manufacture. (Repealed by Statute Law Revision Act 1872 (35 & 36 Vict. c. 63))
| Queen Anne's Bounty Act 1805 (repealed) | 45 Geo. 3. c. 84 | 2 July 1805 |
An act for making more effectual the gracious intentions of her late majesty Queen Anne, for the augmentation of the maintenance of the poor clergy, so far as relates to the returns of certificates into the exchequer and gifts of personal property. (Repealed by Statute Law Revision Act 1964 (c. 79))
| Crinan Canal Act 1805 (repealed) | 45 Geo. 3. c. 85 | 2 July 1805 |
An act for authorising the commissioners of his Majesty's treasury in Great Britain to advance a certain sum of money, to be applied in completing the Crinan canal. (Repealed by Statute Law Revision Act 1872 (35 & 36 Vict. c. 63))
| Importation and Exportation (No. 2) Act 1805 (repealed) | 45 Geo. 3. c. 86 | 10 July 1805 |
An act to explain and amend an act, made in the last session of parliament, (Note: Importation and Exportation Act 1804 (44 Geo. 3. c. 109)) to regulate the importation and exportation of corn, and the bounties and duties payable thereon. (Repealed by Importation and Exportation Act 1821 (1 & 2 Geo. 4. c. 87))
| Bonded Warehouses Act 1805 (repealed) | 45 Geo. 3. c. 87 | 10 July 1805 |
An act to authorise the lords-commissioners of his Majesty's treasury to permit certain articles to be warehoused in different parts in Great Britain, upon giving security for the payment of duties upon the articles therein-mentioned. (Repealed by Warehousing of Goods Act 1823 (4 Geo. 4. c. 24))
| Customs (No. 5) Act 1805 (repealed) | 45 Geo. 3. c. 88 | 10 July 1805 |
An act for repealing the duties of customs on cochineal dust and granilla imported into Great Britain; and for granting other duties in lieu thereof. (Repealed by Statute Law Revision Act 1861 (24 & 25 Vict. c. 101))
| Bank Notes (Forgery) Act 1805 (repealed) | 45 Geo. 3. c. 89 | 10 July 1805 |
An act to alter and extend the provisions of the laws now in force for the punishment of the forgery of bank notes, bills of exchange, and other securities, to every part of Great Britain. (Repealed by Forgery and Counterfeiting Act 1981 (c. 45))
| Militia Act 1805 (repealed) | 45 Geo. 3. c. 90 | 10 July 1805 |
An act to empower his Majesty to retain upon full pay and allowances officers of the militia during the war, notwithstanding the reduction. (Repealed by Statute Law Revision Act 1872 (35 & 36 Vict. c. 63))
| Auditing of Public Accounts Act 1805 (repealed) | 45 Geo. 3. c. 91 | 10 July 1805 |
An act for appointing additional commissioners for the better examining and auditing certain of the publick accounts of Great Britain. (Repealed by Statute Law Revision Act 1861 (24 & 25 Vict. c. 101))
| Writ of Subpœna Act 1805 | 45 Geo. 3. c. 92 | 10 July 1805 |
An Act to amend Two Acts of the Thirteenth (Note: Criminal Law Act 1772 (13 Geo. 3. c. 31)) and Forty-fourth (Note: Apprehension of Offenders Act 1804 (44 Geo. 3. c. 92)) Years of His present Majesty, for the more effectual Execution of the Criminal Laws, and more easy apprehending and bringing to trial Offenders escaping from one Part of the United Kingdom to the other, and from one County to another.
| Drawbacks and Bounties Act 1805 (repealed) | 45 Geo. 3. c. 93 | 10 July 1805 |
An act to amend two acts, passed in the forty-third and forty-fifth years of his present Majesty, for regulating the drawbacks and bounties on the exportation of sugar from Great Britain. (Repealed by Statute Law Revision Act 1861 (24 & 25 Vict. c. 101))
| Duty on Hops Act 1805 (repealed) | 45 Geo. 3. c. 94 | 10 July 1805 |
An act for reducing the duty of excise on hops the growth of Great Britain. (Repealed by Statute Law Revision Act 1872 (35 & 36 Vict. c. 63))
| Taxes (Scotland) Act 1805 (repealed) | 45 Geo. 3. c. 95 | 10 July 1805 |
An act to amend so much of an act of the forty-third year of his present Majesty, (Note: Taxes (Scotland) Act 1803 (43 Geo. 3. c. 150)) for consolidating certain of the provisions of the acts relating to the duties in Scotland under the management of the commissioners for the affairs of taxes, as relates to the appointment of assessors and sub-collectors, and the notices required to be delivered to persons assessed to the said duties. (Repealed by Taxes Management Act 1880 (43 & 44 Vict. c. 19))
| Southern Whale Fishery Act 1805 (repealed) | 45 Geo. 3. c. 96 | 10 July 1805 |
An act for continuing the premiums allowed to ships employed in the Southern Whale Fishery. (Repealed by Customs Law Repeal Act 1825 (6 Geo. 4. c. 105))
| Indemnity for Certain Orders of Council Act 1805 (repealed) | 45 Geo. 3. c. 97 | 10 July 1805 |
An act to indemnify all persons who have been concerned in issuing an order of council and directions for extending the time of certain ships continuing to perform quarantine. (Repealed by Statute Law Revision Act 1872 (35 & 36 Vict. c. 63))
| Drawback on Linens Act 1805 (repealed) | 45 Geo. 3. c. 98 | 10 July 1805 |
An act for increasing the drawback on linens exported from Great Britain to the West Indies. (Repealed by Statute Law Revision Act 1861 (24 & 25 Vict. c. 101))
| Smuggling, etc. Act 1805 (repealed) | 45 Geo. 3. c. 99 | 10 July 1805 |
An act for regulating and encouraging the trade, for the improvement of the revenue, and prevention of Smuggling to and from the Isle of Man. (Repealed by Customs Law Repeal Act 1825 (6 Geo. 4. c. 105))
| Distillation of Spirits Act 1805 (repealed) | 45 Geo. 3. c. 100 | 10 July 1805 |
An act for fetter regulating the distilling of spirits in England for exportation to Scotland, and in Scotland for exportation to England; for the better securing the duties payable thereon; and for altering the time of making entry, and granting licences to distil spirits for Scotland. (Repealed by Statute Law Revision Act 1861 (24 & 25 Vict. c. 101))
| Purchase of Advowsons by Colleges Act 1805 (repealed) | 45 Geo. 3. c. 101 | 10 July 1805 |
An act to repeal so much of an act, passed in the ninth year of the reign of his late majesty, King George the Second, intituled, "An act to restrain the disposition of lands, whereby the same become unalienable," (Note: Charitable Uses Act 1735 (9 Geo. 2. c. 36)) as restrains colleges within the two universities of Oxford and Cambridge from purchasing or holding advowsons, except as therein is provided. (Repealed by Statute Law Revision Act 1872 (35 & 36 Vict. c. 63))
| Pilchard Fishery Act 1805 (repealed) | 45 Geo. 3. c. 102 | 10 July 1805 |
An act to revive and continue an act made in the thirty-first year of his present Majesty, intituled, "An Act for the encouragement of the Pilchard Fishery," (Note: Pilchard Fisheries Act 1791 (31 Geo. 3. c. 45)) by allowing a further bounty upon pilchards taken, cured, and exported. (Repealed by Sea Fisheries Act 1868 (31 & 32 Vict. c. 45))
| Customs (No. 6) Act 1805 (repealed) | 45 Geo. 3. c. 103 | 10 July 1805 |
An act for charging additional duties of customs on straw platting, and on straw hats or bonnets, imported into Great Britain. (Repealed by Statute Law Revision Act 1861 (24 & 25 Vict. c. 101))
| Duties on Spirituous Liquors (Ireland) Act 1805 (repealed) | 45 Geo. 3. c. 104 | 10 July 1805 |
An act to continue, until the twenty-ninth day of September one thousand eight hundred and six, and amend several acts for regulating and securing the collection of the duties on spirituous liquors distilled in Ireland, and the warehousing of such spirits for exportation. (Repealed by Statute Law Revision Act 1872 (35 & 36 Vict. c. 63))
| Assessed Taxes (No. 2) Act 1805 (repealed) | 45 Geo. 3. c. 105 | 10 July 1805 |
An act to continue, until the twenty-ninth day of September one thousand eight hundred and six, and amend several acts for regulating the collection of the duties in Ireland, on fire hearths, on dwelling-houses, on coaches and other carriages, on male servants, on horses, and on dogs. (Repealed by Assessed Taxes (Ireland) Act 1807 (47 Geo. 3 Sess. 1. c. 21))
| Duties on Paper Act 1805 (repealed) | 45 Geo. 3. c. 106 | 10 July 1805 |
An act to continue, until the twenty-ninth day of September one thousand eight hundred and six, and amend several acts for regulating and securing the collection of the duties on paper made in Ireland, and on paper printed or stained in Ireland, to serve for hangings or other uses. (Repealed by Duties on Hides, etc. Act 1824 (5 Geo. 4. c. 55))
| Duty on Spanish Red Wines Act 1805 (repealed) | 45 Geo. 3. c. 107 | 10 July 1805 |
An act for charging, until the twenty-fifth day of March one thousand eight hundred and six, an additional duty on Spanish red wine imported into Ireland. (Repealed by Statute Law Revision Act 1872 (35 & 36 Vict. c. 63))
| Customs and Excise (Ireland) Act 1805 (repealed) | 45 Geo. 3. c. 108 | 10 July 1805 |
An act to continue, until the twenty-ninth day of September one thousand eight hundred and six, several acts for the better collection and security of the revenues of customs and excise in Ireland, and for preventing frauds therein. (Repealed by Statute Law Revision Act 1872 (35 & 36 Vict. c. 63))
| Military Survey (Ireland) Act 1805 (repealed) | 45 Geo. 3. c. 109 | 10 July 1805 |
An act to amend so much of an act, (Note: Irish Charges Act 1801 (41 Geo. 3. (U.K.). c. 32)) for granting to his Majesty several sums of money for defraying the charge of certain permanent services in Ireland, as relates to the military survey of Ireland. (Repealed by Survey Act 1870 (33 & 34 Vict. c. 13))
| Income Tax (No. 3) Act 1805 (repealed) | 45 Geo. 3. c. 110 | 10 July 1805 |
An act for exempting from the duties on profits arising from property, the first half-yearly dividends or annuities, under an act of the present session, (Note: National Debt (No. 3) Act 1805 (45 Geo. 3. c. 40)) for raising the sum of one million five hundred thousand pounds by way of annuities, for the service of Ireland, which shall not have been written into the books of the bank of England. (Repealed by Statute Law Revision Act 1872 (35 & 36 Vict. c. 63))
| County Infirmaries (Ireland) Act 1805 (repealed) | 45 Geo. 3. c. 111 | 10 July 1805 |
An act to amend and render more effectual an act made in the parliament of Ireland in the fifth year of his present Majesty, intituled, "An act for erecting and establishing publick infirmaries or hospitals in this kingdom." (Note: County Hospitals Act 1765 (5 Geo. 3. c. 20 (I))) (Repealed by Statute Law Revision Act 1872 (35 & 36 Vict. c. 63) and Health Services (Northern Ireland) Act 1948 (c. 3 (N.I.)))
| Paving of Streets, etc., Dublin Act 1805 (repealed) | 45 Geo. 3. c. 112 | 10 July 1805 |
An act to appoint commissioners to inquire and examine into any irregularities or abuses which may have taken place in conducting and managing the paving, cleaning, and lighting the streets of Dublin; and to provide for the suspension of the powers and authorities of the corporation of directors and commissioners for paving, cleansing, and lighting the said streets, and for vesting the same in other persons during such suspension; and for the better conducing and managing the business of the said corporation. (Repealed by Dublin Improvement Act 1807 (47 Geo. 3 Sess. 2. c. cix))
| Harbour of Howth Act 1805 (repealed) | 45 Geo. 3. c. 113 | 10 July 1805 |
An act for granting a certain sum of money towards improving the harbour on the north side, of the hill of Howth near Dublin, and rendering it a fit situation for his Majesty's packets. (Repealed by Statute Law Revision Act 1872 (35 & 36 Vict. c. 63))
| Harbour of Leith Act 1805 (repealed) | 45 Geo. 3. c. 114 | 10 July 1805 |
An act for enabling the commissioners of the treasury of Great Britain, to advance a certain sum of money to the lord-provost, magistrates, and council of the city of Edinburgh, towards the completion of the docks and other works in the harbour of Leith. (Repealed by Statute Law Revision Act 1872 (35 & 36 Vict. c. 63))
| Houses of Parliament Act 1805 | 45 Geo. 3. c. 115 | 10 July 1805 |
An act for purchasing certain buildings and ground in or near Palace Yard, Westminster, for the use of the publick.
| Crown Lands at Shilston Bay, Devon Act 1805 (repealed) | 45 Geo. 3. c. 116 | 10 July 1805 |
An act for enabling his Majesty to grant a certain creek, called Chelson Bay, otherwise Shilston Bay, in or near the parish of Plympton Saint Mary, in the county of Devon; and for vesting the same, for a valuable consideration, in the right honourable John lord Boringdon, and his heirs. (Repealed by Statute Law (Repeals) Act 1978 (c. 45))
| Proceedings Against Luke Fox Act 1805 (repealed) | 45 Geo. 3. c. 117 | 10 July 1805 |
An Act to continue the Proceedings in the House of Lords touching the Conduct of Luke Fox, Esquire, One of the Judges of the Court of Common Pleas of that Part of the United Kingdom called Ireland, not-withstanding any Prorogation or Dissolution of Parliament. (Repealed by Statute Law Revision Act 1872 (35 & 36 Vict. c. 63))
| Loans or Exchequer Bills, etc. Act 1805 (repealed) | 45 Geo. 3. c. 118 | 10 July 1805 |
An act for raising the sum of eight millions by loans or exchequer bills, for the service of Great Britain for the year one thousand eight hundred and five. (Repealed by Statute Law Revision Act 1872 (35 & 36 Vict. c. 63))
| Loans or Exchequer Bills, etc. (No. 2) Act 1805 (repealed) | 45 Geo. 3. c. 119 | 10 July 1805 |
An act for raising the sum of two millions five hundred thousand pounds, by loans or exchequer bills, for the service of Great Britain for the year one thousand eight hundred and five; and for indemnifying the bank of England for having advanced money for the publick service on the credit of certain exchequer-bills. (Repealed by Statute Law Revision Act 1872 (35 & 36 Vict. c. 63))
| Loans or Exchequer Bills, etc. (No. 3) Act 1805 (repealed) | 45 Geo. 3. c. 120 | 10 July 1805 |
An act for raising the sum of one million five hundred thousand pounds, by loans or exchequer bills, for the service of Great Britain for the year one thousand eight hundred and five. (Repealed by Statute Law Revision Act 1872 (35 & 36 Vict. c. 63))
| Smuggling Act 1805 (repealed) | 45 Geo. 3. c. 121 | 12 July 1805 |
An Act for the more effectual Prevention of Smuggling. (Repealed by Customs Law Repeal Act 1825 (6 Geo. 4. c. 105))
| Duties on Glass Act 1805 (repealed) | 45 Geo. 3. c. 122 | 12 July 1805 |
An act for charging additional duties on the importation of foreign plate glass into Great Britain. (Repealed by Customs Law Repeal Act 1825 (6 Geo. 4. c. 105))
| Annuity to Duke of Atholl, etc. Act 1805 (repealed) | 45 Geo. 3. c. 123 | 12 July 1805 |
An act for settling and securing a certain annuity on John now duke of Atholl, and the heirs general of the seventh earl of Derby. (Repealed by Statute Law Revision Act 1861 (24 & 25 Vict. c. 101))
| Privilege of Parliament Act 1805 (repealed) | 45 Geo. 3. c. 124 | 12 July 1805 |
An act to amend an act, passed in the fourth year of his present Majesty, intituled, "An act for preventing inconveniences arising in cases of merchants, and such other persons as are within the description of the statutes relating to bankrupts, being entitled to privilege of parliament, and becoming insolvent; and to prevent delay in the entering appearances in actions brought against persons having privilege of parliament." (Note: Bankrupts Act 1763 (4 Geo. 3. c. 33)) (Repealed by Statute Law Revision Act 1872 (35 & 36 Vict. c. 63))
| Proceedings Against Viscount Melville Act 1805 (repealed) | 45 Geo. 3. c. 125 | 12 July 1805 |
An act to provide that the proceedings now depending in the house of commons upon articles of charge of high crimes and misdemeanors which have been exhibited against Henry lord viscount Melville, shall not be discontinued by any prorogation or dissolution of parliament. (Repealed by Statute Law Revision Act 1872 (35 & 36 Vict. c. 63))
| Indemnity to Persons Giving Evidence Against Viscount Melville Act 1805 (repealed) | 45 Geo. 3. c. 126 | 12 July 1805 |
An act to indemnify persons who shall give evidence against Henry lord viscount Melville, upon the impeachment voted against him by the commons of the united kingdom of Great Britain and Ireland in parliament assembled, in respect of acts done by such persons in any office or employment held by them under the said lord viscount Melville, during the time he held and enjoyed the office of treasurer of his Majesty's navy. (Repealed by Statute Law Revision Act 1872 (35 & 36 Vict. c. 63))
| British Museum Act 1805 (repealed) | 45 Geo. 3. c. 127 | 12 July 1805 |
An Act to vest the Townleian Collection of Ancient Sculpture in the Trustees of the British Museum for the Use of the Publick. (Repealed by British Museum Act 1963 (c. 24))
| Bringing of Coals, etc., to London, etc. Act 1805 (repealed) | 45 Geo. 3. c. 128 | 12 July 1805 |
An act for allowing, under certain restrictions, until the first day of August one thousand eight hundred and six, the bringing a limited quantity of coals, culm, or cinders to London and Westminster by inland navigation. (Repealed by Customs Law Repeal Act 1825 (6 Geo. 4. c. 105))
| Appropriation Act 1805 (repealed) | 45 Geo. 3. c. 129 | 12 July 1805 |
An act for granting to his Majesty a certain fund of money out of the consolidated fund of Great Britain; and for applying certain monies therein-mentioned for the service of Great Britain, for the year one thousand eight hundred and five; and for further appropriating the supplies granted in this session of parliament. (Repealed by Statute Law Revision Act 1872 (35 & 36 Vict. c. 63))

=== Local acts ===
| Short title | Citation | Royal assent |
Long title
| Road from Derby to Hurdloe House Act 1805 (repealed) | 45 Geo. 3. c. i | 22 February 1805 |
An Act to continue and amend an Act passed in the Seventeenth Year of His present Majesty, (Note: Derby Roads Act 1777 (17 Geo. 3. c. 92)) for repairing the Road from the Town of Derby through Ashborne to Hurdloe House in the County of Derby. (Repealed by Road from Derby to Hurdloe House and Compton Branch Act 1828 (9 Geo. 4. c. lxxix))
| London Coal Trade Act 1805 (repealed) | 45 Geo. 3. c. ii | 22 February 1805 |
An Act to indemnify all Persons employed in the Disposal of Coals in the Coal Market in the City of London, who have incurred Penalties under certain Provisions of an Act, made in the Forty third Year of His present Majesty, (Note: London Coal Trade Act 1803 (43 Geo. 3. c. cxxxiv)) for establishing a free Market in the City of London for the Sale of Coals, and for preventing Frauds and Impositions in the Vend and Delivery of all Coals brought into the Port of London, within certain therein mentioned. (Repealed by Statute Law (Repeals) Act 2008 (c. 12))
| Roads to and from Crewkerne Act 1805 | 45 Geo. 3. c. iii | 1 March 1805 |
An Act for repairing several Roads leading to and from the Town of Crewkerne, in the County of Somerset.
| Manchester, Bolton and Bury Canal Act 1805 or the Manchester, Bury and Bolton Canal Act 1805 (repealed) | 45 Geo. 3. c. iv | 12 March 1805 |
An Act to enable the Company of Proprietors of the Canal Navigation from Manchester to Bolton and to Bury, to raise Money to complete the same. (Repealed by Manchester, Bolton and Bury Canal and Railway Act 1831 (1 & 2 Will. 4. c. lx))
| Surrey Iron Railway Act 1805 (repealed) | 45 Geo. 3. c. v | 12 March 1805 |
An Act to enable the Company of Proprietors of the Surrey Iron Railway to raise a further Sum of Money, for completing the said Railway, and the Works thereunto belonging. (Repealed by Surrey Iron Railway Act 1846 (9 & 10 Vict. c. cccxxxiii))
| Bethnal Green Road Act 1805 (repealed) | 45 Geo. 3. c. vi | 12 March 1805 |
An Act to enlarge the Term and Powers of Two Acts, passed in the Twenty-ninth Year of His late Majesty, (Note: Bethnal Green Road Act 1756 (29 Geo. 2. c. 43)) and the Seventh Year of His present Majesty, (Note: Bethnal Green Road Act 1766 (7 Geo. 3. c. 105)) for making a Road from the East Side of the Parish of Saint Matthew, Bethnal Green, in the County of Middlesex, to the East End of Church Street, in the said Parish, and to open a Way into Shoreditch, and for keeping the same in Repair. (Repealed by Statute Law (Repeals) Act 2013 (c. 2))
| Road from Hollinwood to Featherstall Act 1805 (repealed) | 45 Geo. 3. c. vii | 12 March 1805 |
An Act for making and maintaining a Road from Hollinwood, in the Township of Chadderton, to Featherstall, in the Township of Hundersfield, in the County Palatine of Lancaster, and for making and maintaining several Branches of Road to communicate therewith. (Repealed by Road from Hollinwood to Littleborough (Lancashire) Act 1827 (7 & 8 Geo. 4. c. lv))
| Winterton and East and West Somerton Inclosure and Drainage Act 1805 | 45 Geo. 3. c. viii | 12 March 1805 |
An Act for inclosing and draining certain Lands in the Parishes of Winterton, East Somerton, and West Somerton, in the County of Norfolk.
| Simonburn Inclosure Act 1805 | 45 Geo. 3. c. ix | 12 March 1805 |
An Act for inclosing Lands in the Parish of Simonburn, in the County of Northumberland.
| Rothbury and Elsdon Inclosures Act 1805 | 45 Geo. 3. c. x | 12 March 1805 |
An Act for inclosing Lands in the Parishes of Rothbury and Elsdon in the County of Northumberland.
| Ashton Canal Act 1805 | 45 Geo. 3. c. xi | 18 March 1805 |
An Act for enabling the Company of Proprietors of the Canal Navigation from Manchester to or near Ashton-under-Lyne and Oldham more effectually to provide for the Discharge of their Debts, and to complete the said Canal and the Cuts and Works thereto belonging.
| Peak Forest Canal Act 1805 | 45 Geo. 3. c. xii | 18 March 1805 |
An Act for enabling the Company of Proprietors of the Peak Forest Canal more effectually to provide for the Discharge of their Debts, and to complete the said Canal, and the Cut, Railways or Stone Roads and other Works thereof.
| Middleton-in-Teesdale Inclosure Act 1805 | 45 Geo. 3. c. xiii | 25 March 1805 |
An Act for inclosing Lands in the Parish of Middleton in Teesdale, in the County of Durham.
| Nightingale's and Bolton Road Act 1805 (repealed) | 45 Geo. 3. c. xiv | 5 April 1805 |
An Act for more effectually repairing and improving the Road from a Place called Nightingales, in the Township of Heath Charnock to the Bridge at the West End of the Town of Bolton in the Moors, in the County Palatine of Lancaster, and other Roads therein mentioned. (Repealed by Bolton and Nightingale Road and other Roads in Lancashire Act 1824 (5 Geo. 4. c. cv))
| Pengate and Latchett's Bridge Road (Wiltshire) Act 1805 (repealed) | 45 Geo. 3. c. xv | 5 April 1805 |
An Act for continuing the Term, and altering and enlarging the Powers of Two Acts, passed in the Thirty-first Year of His late Majesty, (Note: Wilts Roads Act 1757 (31 Geo. 2. c. 68)) and the Ninth Year of His present Majesty, (Note: Wilts Roads (No. 2) Act 1769 (9 Geo. 3. c. 73)) for amending the Road leading from Pengate to Latchett's Bridge, and other Roads therein described, in the County of Wilts, so far as the same relate to the First District of Road therein mentioned, and for amending other Roads near or adjoining to the said Roads. (Repealed by Pengate and Tinhead Road (Wiltshire) Act 1826 (7 Geo. 4. c. xv))
| Roads in Clackmannan and Perth Act 1805 (repealed) | 45 Geo. 3. c. xvi | 5 April 1805 |
An Act for continuing the Term, and altering and enlarging the Powers of Two Acts passed in the Thirty-fourth (Note: Clackmannan and Perth Roads Act 1794 (34 Geo. 3. c. 139)) and Thirty-seventh (Note: Clackmannan and Perth Roads Act 1797 (37 Geo. 3. c. 166)) Years of His present Majesty, for making and repairing certain Roads in the Counties of Clackmannan and Perth and for making and keeping in Repair several other Roads communicating therewith. (Repealed by Clackmannan and Perth Roads Act 1840 (3 & 4 Vict. c. xl))
| Stockton-upon-Tees, Darlington and Barnard Castle Road Act 1805 (repealed) | 45 Geo. 3. c. xvii | 5 April 1805 |
An Act for repealing Three Acts passed in the Twentieth, (Note: Stockton to Barnard Castle Road Act 1746 (20 Geo. 2. c. 25)) Twenty-second, (Note: Stockton to Barnard Castle Road Act 1748 (22 Geo. 2. c. 51)) and Twenty-sixth (Note: Stockton and Barnard Castle Road Act 1753 (26 Geo. 2. c. 89)) Years of the Reign of King George the Second, for repairing the Road from Stockton-upon-Tees to Darlington, and from thence to Barnardcastle, in the County of Durham; and for more effectually repairing the said Road. (Repealed by Stockton and Barnard Castle Road Act 1825 (6 Geo. 4. c. xiii))
| Burrell's Estate Act 1805 | 45 Geo. 3. c. xviii | 5 April 1805 |
An Act for vesting certain Estates, situate in the Counties of Essex and Surrey, devised by the Will of Sir William Burrell Baronet, deceased, in Trustees, upon Trust, to sell the same; and for laying out the Money arising from the Sale thereof in the Purchase of Estates in the County of Sussex, to be settled to the same Uses as the Estates so sold.
| Carlton, Chellington and Steventon Inclosures Act 1805 | 45 Geo. 3. c. xix | 5 April 1805 |
An Act for inclosing Lands in the Parishes of Carlton, Chellington, and Steventon, in the County of Bedford.
| Sale Inclosure Act 1805 | 45 Geo. 3. c. xx | 5 April 1805 |
An Act for inclosing Lands in the Township of Sale, in the Parish of Ashton upon Mersey, in the County Palatine of Chester.
| Edinburgh Police Act 1805 (repealed) | 45 Geo. 3. c. xxi | 10 April 1805 |
An Act for regulating the Police of the City of Edinburgh, and the adjoining Districts; and for other Purposes relating thereto. (Repealed by Edinburgh Police Act 1812 (52 Geo. 3. c. clxxii))
| Road from Edinburgh to Lanark Act 1805 (repealed) | 45 Geo. 3. c. xxii | 10 April 1805 |
An Act for making and maintaining a Road leading from the Limits of the Counties of Edinburgh and Lanark to the Burgh of Lanark in the County of Lanark. (Repealed by Road from Edinburgh to Lanark Act 1840 (3 & 4 Vict. c. ciii))
| London Bread Trade Act 1805 (repealed) | 45 Geo. 3. c. xxiii | 11 April 1805 |
An Act for amending an Act passed in the Thirty seventh Year of His present Majesty, (Note: Assise and Making of Bread, London Act 1797 (37 Geo. 3. c. 98)) to amend and render more effectual an Act, made in the Thirty first Year of His late Majesty, (Note: Assise and Making of Bread, London Act 1797 (31 Geo. 2. c. 29)) for the due making of Bread, and to regulate the Price and Assize thereof, and to punish Persons who shall adulterate Meal, Flour or Bread, so far as the same relates to the Assize and making of Bread, to be sold in the City of London and the Liberties thereof, and within the Weekly Bills of Mortality, and Ten Miles of the Royal Exchange. (Repealed by London Bread Trade Act 1815 (55 Geo. 3. c. xcix))
| Bowyer's Lottery Act 1805 (repealed) | 45 Geo. 3. c. xxiv | 11 April 1805 |
An Act to enable Robert Bowyer of Pall Mall, in the City of Westminster, Esquire, to dispose of his Collection of Paintings, Drawings and Engravings, together with several Copies of certain Books therein mentioned, by way of Chance. (Repealed by Statute Law (Repeals) Act 2013 (c. 2))
| Shillingford and Reading Road and Shillingford Bridge Act 1805 (repealed) | 45 Geo. 3. c. xxv | 11 April 1805 |
An Act for continuing the Term, and altering and enlarging the Powers of Two Acts, passed in the Fourth (Note: Shillingford Roads and Bridge Act 1764 (4 Geo. 3. c. 42)) and Twenty-fourth (Note: Shillingford Oxford (Roads and Bridge) Act 1783 (24 Geo. 3. Sess. 1. c. 22)) Years of His present Majesty, for repairing the Road from Shillingford in the County of Oxford, through Wallingford and Pangborne to Reading, in the County of Berks; and for building a Bridge over the River Thames at or near Shillingford Ferry. (Repealed by Shillingford and Reading Road Act 1827 (7 & 8 Geo. 4. c. xix))
| Sutherland Roads and Bridges Act 1805 (repealed) | 45 Geo. 3. c. xxvi | 11 April 1805 |
An Act for assessing the Proprietors of Lands in the County of Sutherland, towards the Expence of making and supporting such Roads and Bridges therein, as shall be approved of by the Commissioners, appointed by an Act of the Forty-third Year of His present Majesty, (Note: Highway (Scotland) Act 1803 (43 Geo. 3. c. 80)) for making Roads and building Bridges in the Highlands of Scotland; for making a Turnpike Road from Portinleik to the Ord; and converting the Statute Labour of the said County into Money. (Repealed by Sutherland Roads, Bridges and Statute Labour Act 1821 (1 & 2 Geo. 4. c. xxiii))
| Roads from Kirkby Steven through Sedbergh to Greeta Bridge Act 1805 (repealed) | 45 Geo. 3. c. xxvii | 11 April 1805 |
An Act for continuing the Term, and altering and enlarging the Powers of Two Acts, passed in the Second (Note: Lancaster and Westmorland Roads Act 1762 (2 Geo. 3. c. 83)) and Twenty-fourth (Note: Westmorland and Yorkshire Roads Act 1784 (24 Geo. 3. Sess. 2. c. 70)) Years of His present Majesty, for repairing the Roads from Kirkby Steven High Lane Head, in the County of Westmorland, through Sedbergh, to Greeta Bridge, in the County Palatine of Lancaster, and other Roads therein mentioned in the said, Counties and in the County of York. (Repealed by Kirkby Steven and Greeta Bridge Roads Act 1826 (7 Geo. 4. c. lxxii))
| Ayr (County) Turnpike Roads Act 1805 (repealed) | 45 Geo. 3. c. xxviii | 17 May 1805 |
An Act for altering, amending and consolidating, several Acts for repairing Turnpike Roads, in the County of Ayr; for repairing other Roads therein; and for making more effectual the Statute Labour in the said County. (Repealed by Ayr (County) Turnpike Roads Act 1827 (7 & 8 Geo. 4. c. cix))
| Road from Biggar to Leadhills Act 1805 (repealed) | 45 Geo. 3. c. xxix | 17 May 1805 |
An Act for continuing the Term and altering the Powers of so much of Two Acts, made in Twelfth (Note: Lanark Roads Act 1772 (12 Geo. 3. c. 82)) and Thirty-second (Note: Lanark Roads Act 1792 (32 Geo. 3. c. 124)) Years of His present Majesty, as relate to the Road from Ingliston Bridge, by Biggar, to Leadhills, and to the Confines of the County of Lanark; and for making and maintaining a Continuation of the said Road from Dolphinton to the Confines of the County of Edinburgh. (Repealed by Roads and Bridges in Lanark Act 1814 (54 Geo. 3. c. ccxv))
| Ardrossan Harbour Act 1805 (repealed) | 45 Geo. 3. c. xxx | 17 May 1805 |
An Act for erecting and maintaining a Harbour, Docks and other Works, at Ardrossan, in the County of Ayr. (Repealed by Ardrossan Harbour Consolidation Act 1864 (27 & 28 Vict. c. ccviii))
| Excise Incorporation in Scotland Act 1805 (repealed) | 45 Geo. 3. c. xxxi | 17 May 1805 |
An Act for confirming the Charter, and enlarging the Powers of the Incorporation of the Officers of Excise in Scotland. (Repealed by Statute Law (Repeals) Act 1998 (c. 43))
| Leith Harbour Act 1805 (repealed) | 45 Geo. 3. c. xxxii | 17 May 1805 |
An Act for raising a further Sum of Money for the Improvement of the Harbour of Leith. (Repealed by Leith Harbour and Docks Act 1875 (38 & 39 Vict. c. clx))
| Carmarthen Fisheries Act 1805 (repealed) | 45 Geo. 3. c. xxxiii | 17 May 1805 |
An Act for the Preservation of Salmon and other Fish in the Rivers in the County of Carmarthen and County of the Borough of Carmarthen. (Repealed by Salmon Fishery Act 1861 (24 & 25 Vict. c. 109))
| Plymouth and Stonehouse Bridge Roads Act 1805 (repealed) | 45 Geo. 3. c. xxxiv | 17 May 1805 |
An Act for the making, repairing, lighting, watching, and watering certain Roads from the Borough of Plymouth to Stonehouse Bridge and Plymouth Dock, in the County of Devon, and for regulating the Stands and Fares of Hackney Coaches and Carts using the same. (Repealed by Plymouth and Stonehouse Roads and Transport Act 1843 (6 & 7 Vict. c. lxi))
| Road from Grantham to Nottingham Trent Bridge Act 1805 (repealed) | 45 Geo. 3. c. xxxv | 17 May 1805 |
An Act for continuing the Term and altering and enlarging the Powers of Two Acts, passed in the Thirty-second Year of His late Majesty, (Note: Lincoln and Nottingham Roads Act 1758 (32 Geo. 2. c. 53)) and in the Seventh Year of His present Majesty, (Note: Lincoln and Notts Roads (No. 2) Act 1766 (7 Geo. 3. c. 79)) so far as the same relate to the Road leading from Grantham, in the County of Lincoln, to Nottingham Trent Bridge in the County of Nottingham. (Repealed by Road from Grantham to Nottingham Trent Bridge Act 1825 (6 Geo. 4. c. xxiv))
| Road from Hinckley to Lutterworth Act 1805 (repealed) | 45 Geo. 3. c. xxxvi | 17 May 1805 |
An Act to continue and amend Two Acts, passed in the Second (Note: Leicestershire Roads Act 1762 (2 Geo. 3. c. 54)) and Twenty-fourth (Note: Northamptonshire Roads Act 1783 (24 Geo. 3. Sess. 1. c. 28)) Years of His present Majesty, for repairing the Road from Castle Street, at the End of the Town of Hinckley, to Lutterworth Town's End, and from the Guide Post at Walcot Town's End, in the County of Leicester, to the Eighty Mile Stone in Welford Field, in the County of Northampton. (Repealed by Road from Hinckley to Lutterworth Act 1823 (4 Geo. 4. c. lx))
| Road from the Swindon Turnpike to Everley Act 1805 (repealed) | 45 Geo. 3. c. xxxvii | 17 May 1805 |
An Act to enlarge the Term and Powers of Two Acts, passed in the Second (Note: Wilts Roads Act 1762 (2 Geo. 3. c. 49)) and Twenty-fourth (Note: Wiltshire Roads (No. 2) Act 1783 (24 Geo. 3. Sess. 1. c. 30)) Years of His present Majesty, for amending the Road from the Turnpike Road at or near Swindon, to Marlborough, and from Marlborough to Everley, in the County of Wilts. (Repealed by Marlborough District of Roads Act 1832 (2 & 3 Will. 4. c. xcvii))
| Barrow's Estate Act 1805 | 45 Geo. 3. c. xxxviii | 17 May 1805 |
An Act for enabling Thomas Barrow Esquire, and the Person and Persons for the time being respectively entitled to the Freehold in Possession of and in the Moiety of certain Estates in Manchester, in the County Palatine of Lancaster, under the Will of William Barrow, deceased, to grant and convey the same Moiety in Fee Simple for building upon, or otherwise improving the same, reserving Rents, or to make Building Leases thereof, or to join with the Owner or Owners, for the time being, of the other Moiety thereof in making such Grants and Conveyances, or Leases respectively.
| Frizington Inclosure Act 1805 | 45 Geo. 3. c. xxxix | 17 May 1805 |
An Act for inclosing Lands in the Township and Manor of Frizington, in the Parish of Arlecdon, in the County of Cumberland.
| Roads and Bridges in Ross, Cromarty and Nairn Act 1805 | 45 Geo. 3. c. xl | 5 June 1805 |
An Act for assessing the Proprietors of Lands in the County of Ross, and such Parts of the Counties of Cromarty and Nairn as lie in the said County of Ross, towards the Expence of making and supporting such Roads and Bridges therein as shall be approved of by the Commissioners appointed by an Act, passed in the Forty third Year of His present Majesty, for making Roads and building Bridges in the Highlands of Scotland.
| Needwood Church Act 1805 | 45 Geo. 3. c. xli | 5 June 1805 |
An Act to enable His Majesty to grant Part of His Majesty's Allotment of the disafforested Forest or Chase of Needwood, in the County of Stafford, for the Erection of a Church and the Endowment of the Minister thereof, and for building and establishing the said Church.
| Kingston-upon-Hull Dock Act 1805 | 45 Geo. 3. c. xlii | 5 June 1805 |
An Act for raising a further Sum of Money for carrying into Execution an Act, passed in the Forty second Year of the Reign of His present Majesty, (Note: Kingston-upon-Hull Dock Act 1802 (42 Geo. 3. c. xci)) for making additional Basons or Docks at Kingston upon Hull.
| Hull and Leven Canal Act 1805 | 45 Geo. 3. c. xliii | 5 June 1805 |
An Act for altering and amending an Act, passed in the Forty first Year of His present Majesty, (Note: Hull and Leven Canal Act 1801 (41 Geo. 3. (U.K.) c. xxxii)) for enabling Charlotta Bethell Widow, to make and maintain a Navigable Canal from the River Hull to Leven Bridge, in the East Riding of the County of York.
| Portsmouth Gaol Act 1805 (repealed) | 45 Geo. 3. c. xliv | 5 June 1805 |
An Act for building a New Gaol in the Borough of Portsmouth, in the County of Southampton. (Repealed by Statute Law (Repeals) Act 2008 (c. 12))
| Blaenavon Church Act 1805 | 45 Geo. 3. c. xlv | 5 June 1805 |
An Act for establishing a new Church or Chapel at Blaenavon, in the Parish of Lanover, in the County of Monmouth.
| Elgin County Roads and Bridges Act 1805 | 45 Geo. 3. c. xlvi | 5 June 1805 |
An Act for making and repairing certain Roads in the County of Elgin, and for levying a Conversion in lieu of the Statute Labour, and otherwise regulating the making and repairing the High Roads and Bridges in the said County.
| Road from Norwich to Scole Bridge Act 1805 (repealed) | 45 Geo. 3. c. xlvii | 5 June 1805 |
An Act for continuing the Term and altering and enlarging the Powers of Two Acts, passed in the Ninth and Twelfth Years of His present Majesty, for repairing the Road from the City of Norwich to Scole Bridge, in the County of Norfolk. (Repealed by Norwich and Scole Bridge Road Act 1826 (7 Geo. 4. c. xxvii))
| Road from Lostwithiel Act 1805 (repealed) | 45 Geo. 3. c. xlviii | 5 June 1805 |
An Act to continue the Term and alter and enlarge the Powers of Two Acts, passed in the Second and Twenty-fourth Years of His present Majesty, for repairing the Road from the Loftawithiel Turnpike Road, through Tregony, to Ruan Lanehorne, and from Dennis Water to Three hundred Yards on the South Side of Trethim Mill, in the County of Cornwall. (Repealed by Road from Creed to Ruan Lanehorne (Cornwall) Act 1827 (7 & 8 Geo. 4. c. lxxiii))
| Melton Mowbray Road Act 1805 (repealed) | 45 Geo. 3. c. xlix | 5 June 1805 |
An Act for more effectually repairing and improving the Road from Melton Mowbray, in the County of Leicester, to the Guide Post in Saint Margaret's Field, Leicester, and another Road therein mentioned. (Repealed by Melton Mowbray and Leicester Road Act 1825 (6 Geo. 4. c. lxxxi))
| Road from Hinckley to Bishop's Gate Act 1805 (repealed) | 45 Geo. 3. c. l | 5 June 1805 |
An Act to revive, continue and enlarge the Term and Powers of Three Acts, passed in the Twenty seventh (Note: Leicester and Warwick Roads Act 1754 (27 Geo. 2. c. 42)) and Twenty ninth (Note: Hinckley and Coventry Road Act 1756 (29 Geo. 2. c. 66)) Years of His late Majesty, and in the Second Year of His present Majesty, (Note: Hinckley and Coventry Road Act 1762 (2 Geo. 3. c. 69)) for repairing the Roads therein mentioned, so far as the said Acts relate to the Road leading from the Town of Hinckley in the County of Leicester to the Town of Nuneaton, in the County of Warwick, and from thence to Bishop's Gate in the City of Coventry. (Repealed by Hinckley, Nuneaton and Coventry Road Act 1825 (6 Geo. 4. c. x))
| Cork and Limerick Road Act 1805 | 45 Geo. 3. c. li | 5 June 1805 |
An Act for the better amending and repairing of the Road leading from the Bounds of the Counties of Limerick and Cork, between the Towns of Kilmallock and Charleville, to the City of Cork.
| Carlow and Kilkenny Road Act 1805 (repealed) | 45 Geo. 3. c. lii | 5 June 1805 |
An Act for the better amending and repairing of the Road leading from the Town of Carlow to the City of Kilkenny. (Repealed by Carlow, Kilkenny and Tipperary Roads Act 1833 (3 & 4 Will. 4. c. cxii))
| Duke of Norfolk's Estate Act 1805 | 45 Geo. 3. c. liii | 5 June 1805 |
An Act for vesting several Messuages and Hereditaments in and near Sheffield, in the County of York, and divers detached Parts of the settled Estates of the most Noble Charles Duke of Norfolk in Trustees, upon Trust to sell; and to enable the said Charles Duke of Norfolk to enfranchise certain Copyhold and Customary Lands, Parcels of certain Manors in the Counties of Norfolk, Suffolk, and Sussex, other Parts of the said settled Estates; and for laying out the Monies arising from such Sales and Enfranchisements in the Purchase of more convenient Estates; and for other Purposes therein mentioned.
| Crowley's Estate Act 1805 | 45 Geo. 3. c. liv | 5 June 1805 |
An Act for vesting certain Estates comprized in the Settlements executed on the Marriages of Elizabeth afterwards the Wife of John Earl of Ashburnham, and Theodosia, afterwards the Wife of Charles Boone Esquire, in new Trustees.
| Buchanan's Estate Act 1805 | 45 Geo. 3. c. lv | 5 June 1805 |
An Act for exchanging Part of the Fee Simple Estate of Sir John Buchanan Baronet, in the County of Northumberland, for his settled Estates in the Counties of Bedford and Buckingham.
| Road from Berwick-upon-Tweed and Roads from Billie Causeway Act 1805 (repealed) | 45 Geo. 3. c. lvi | 27 June 1805 |
An Act to continue the Term and alter and enlarge the Powers of an Act, made in the Twenty seventh Year of His present Majesty, (Note: Berwick Roads Act 1787 (27 Geo. 3. c. 89)) for repairing the Road leading from Berwick upon Tweed, by Ayton Bridge, to Dunglas Bridge, and also the Roads from Billie Causeway and Preston Bridge, to join the said Road at or near Cockburnspath Tower, in the County of Berwick. (Repealed by Berwick-upon-Tweed and Dunglas Bridge Road Act 1832 (2 & 3 Will. 4. c. xxxi))
| Crossford Bridge and Altrincham Road Act 1805 (repealed) | 45 Geo. 3. c. lvii | 27 June 1805 |
An Act for continuing the Term, and altering and enlarging the Powers of an Act, passed in the Thirty sixth Year of His present Majesty, (Note: Crossford Bridge and Altrincham Road Act 1796 (36 Geo. 3. c. 143)) for repairing the Road leading from Crossford Bridge, in the County Palatine of Lancaster, to Altrincham, in the County Palatine of Chester. (Repealed by Road from Crossford Bridge to Altrincham (Cheshire) Act 1827 (7 & 8 Geo. 4. c. xcv))
| Port of London Improvement Act 1805 (repealed) | 45 Geo. 3. c. lviii | 27 June 1805 |
An Act to alter and amend an Act, passed in the Fortieth Year of His present Majesty, (Note: Port of London Improvement Act 1800 (39 & 40 Geo. 3. c. xlvii)) for making Wet Docks, Basons, Cuts and other Works, for the greater Accommodation and Security of Shipping, Commerce and Revenue, within the Port of London, and for extending the Powers and Provisions of the said Act. (Repealed by London Docks Act 1828 (9 Geo. 4. c. cxvi))
| Salford Quarter Sessions' Chairman's Salary Act 1805 (repealed) | 45 Geo. 3. c. lix | 27 June 1805 |
An Act to empower the Justices of the Peace within the Division or Hundred of Salford, in the County Palatine of Lancaster, to raise a Sum of Money to be paid by Way of Salary to the Chairman of the Quarter Sessions for the said Hundred. (Repealed by Lancashire Quarter Sessions Act 1928 (18 & 19 Geo. 5. c. xxx))
| Childwall and Great and Little Woolton Inclosures Act 1805 | 45 Geo. 3. c. lx | 27 June 1805 |
An Act for inclosing Lands in the Manors or Townships of Childwall, Great Woolton and Little Woolton, in the Parish of Childwall, in the County Palatine of Lancaster.
| High Peak and Castleton Courts Baron Act 1805 (repealed) | 45 Geo. 3. c. lxi | 27 June 1805 |
An Act to explain and amend an Act, passed in the Thirty third Year of His late Majesty, (Note: Courts Baron of High Peak and Castleton Act 1759 (33 Geo. 2. c. 31)) for regulating the Proceedings in personal Actions in the respective Courts Baron of the Hundred of High Peak, and Manor of Castleton, in the County of Derby; and for extending the Powers of the said Courts. (Repealed by Statute Law (Repeals) Act 2013 (c. 2))
| Royal Rock Ferry (Liverpool) Act 1805 | 45 Geo. 3. c. lxii | 27 June 1805 |
An Act for improving the Passage between the Town of Liverpool, and the County of Chester at the Rock Ferry, on the River Mersey, and for levying Tolls on Vessels using the same.
| Port of London Improvement and City Canal Act 1805 (repealed) | 45 Geo. 3. c. lxiii | 27 June 1805 |
An Act to authorize the Advancement of further Sums of Money out of the Consolidated Fund, for completing the Canal and other Works directed to be made by an Act, passed in the Thirty ninth Year of His present Majesty, intituled "An Act for rendering more commodious, and for better regulating the Port of London." (Note: Port of London Improvement and City Canal Act 1799 (39 Geo. 3. c. lxix)) (Repealed by Thames Conservancy Act 1894 (57 & 58 Vict. c. clxxxvii))
| Rotherham and Tankersley Park Road Act 1805 (repealed) | 45 Geo. 3. c. lxiv | 27 June 1805 |
An Act for enlarging the Term and Powers of Two Acts, of the Fourth (Note: Derby and Yorkshire Roads Act 1764 (4 Geo. 3. c. 65)) and Fourteenth (Note: Rotherham to Tankersley Park Road Act 1774 (14 Geo. 3. c. 114)) Years of His present Majesty, so far as relates to the Road from the North End of the Town of Rotherham, to the East Side of Tankersley Park, in the County of York. (Repealed by Rotherham and Tankersley Park Turnpike Road Act 1825 (6 Geo. 4. c. lii))
| North Shields Lighthouses Act 1805 | 45 Geo. 3. c. lxv | 27 June 1805 |
An Act to enable the Master, Pilots and Seamen of the Trinity House of Newcastle upon Tyne, to erect Two new Light Houses at North Shields, at or near the Port of Newcastle, and to raise a Fund for defraying the Charge thereof.
| Redditch Chapel Act 1805 | 45 Geo. 3. c. lxvi | 27 June 1805 |
An Act for building a Chapel in the Hamlet of Redditch, in the Parish of Tardebigg, in the Counties of Worcester and Warwick.
| Bath Court of Requests Act 1805 (repealed) | 45 Geo. 3. c. lxvii | 27 June 1805 |
An Act for the more speedy and easy Recovery of Small Debts in the City of Bath, and the Liberties thereof, and in the several Parishes and Places therein mentioned, in the County of Somerset. (Repealed by County Courts Act 1846 (9 & 10 Vict. c. 95))
| Grand Junction Canal Act 1805 | 45 Geo. 3. c. lxviii | 27 June 1805 |
An Act for altering, amending and enlarging the Powers of certain Acts, for making and maintaining the Grand Junction Canal.
| Lee Navigation Improvement Act 1805 | 45 Geo. 3. c. lxix | 27 June 1805 |
An Act for the better Preservation, and further Improvement, of the Navigation of the River Lee, in the Counties of Hertford, Essex and Middlesex.
| Kennet and Avon Canal Act 1805 | 45 Geo. 3. c. lxx | 27 June 1805 |
An Act for enabling the Company of Proprietors of the Kennet and Avon Canal Navigation to complete the same, and for altering and enlarging the Powers of the several Acts passed for making the said Canal.
| Leicestershire and Northamptonshire Union Canal Act 1805 | 45 Geo. 3. c. lxxi | 27 June 1805 |
An Act to enable the Company of Proprietors of the Leicestershire and Northamptonshire Union Canal to vary the Line of the said Canal, and to alter and amend the Powers of the Act (Note: Leicestershire and Northamptonshire Union Canal Act 1793 (33 Geo. 3. c. 98)) passed for making the said Canal.
| Eau Brink Act 1805 or the Bedford Level Drainage and Ouse Navigation Act 1805 | 45 Geo. 3. c. lxxii | 27 June 1805 |
An Act for explaining and amending an Act passed in the Thirty fifth Year of His present Majesty, (Note: Eau Brink Act 1795 (35 Geo. 3. c. 77)) for improving the Drainage of the Middle and South Levels, Part of the Great Level of the Fens called Bedford Level, and certain Low Lands adjoining or near thereto, and to the River Ouze, in the County of Norfolk; and for improving the Navigation of the said River from or near a Place called Eau Brink (Note: Eau Brink is near to Wiggenhall St Germans, Norfolk, on the River Great Ouse.) to the Harbour of King's Lynn; and for improving the Navigation of the several Rivers communicating with the said River Ouze.
| Rumney Bridge Act 1805 (repealed) | 45 Geo. 3. c. lxxiii | 27 June 1805 |
An Act for building a Bridge over that Part of the River Rumney which divides the Parish of Rumney, in the County of Monmouth, and the Parish of Roath, in the County of Glamorgan. (Repealed by Turnpike Trusts in South Wales Act 1844 (7 & 8 Vict. c. 91))
| Roads in Glamorgan Act 1805 (repealed) | 45 Geo. 3. c. lxxiv | 27 June 1805 |
An Act for more effectually making, repairing, and improving, several Roads in the County of Glamorgan. (Repealed by Roads in Glamorgan Act 1827 (7 & 8 Geo. 4. c. xcviii))
| Totnes and Ashburton Roads and Emmett Bridge over River Dart Act 1805 | 45 Geo. 3. c. lxxv | 27 June 1805 |
An Act for continuing the Term, and altering and enlarging the Powers of Two Acts, passed in the Third (Note: Totnes Roads Act 1763 (3 Geo. 3. c. 38)) and Twenty-fourth (Note: Totnes Roads Act 1784 (24 Geo. 3. Sess. 2. c. 64)) Years of His present Majesty, for amending the Roads leading from or near the North Side of the Town of Totnes, towards Ashburton, in the County of Devon, and for building a Bridge at or near a Place called Emmett, across the River Dart.
| Roads from Spalding High Bridge to Donington Act 1805 (repealed) | 45 Geo. 3. c. lxxvi | 27 June 1805 |
An Act to continue the Term, and alter and enlarge the Powers of Two Acts, passed in the Fourth (Note: Lincoln Road Act 1764 (4 Geo. 3. c. 80)) and Twenty-fourth (Note: Lincoln Roads Act 1783 (24 Geo. 3. Sess. 1. c. 34)) Years of His present Majesty, for repairing and widening the Roads from Spalding High Bridge to the Market Place in Donington, and from the Tenth Mile Stone in the Parish of Gosbertown, to the Eighth Mile Stone, in the Parish of Wigtoft in the County of Lincoln. (Repealed by Roads from Spalding High Bridge to Donington Act 1826 (7 Geo. 4. c. lxxxv))
| Road from Leicester to Lutterworth Act 1805 (repealed) | 45 Geo. 3. c. lxxvii | 27 June 1805 |
An Act for more effectually repairing, widening, and improving, the Road from the Borough of Leicester to the Town of Lutterworth, in the County of Leicester. (Repealed by Road from Leicester to Lutterworth Act 1825 (6 Geo. 4. c. lxxx))
| Road from Welford Bridge Act 1805 (repealed) | 45 Geo. 3. c. lxxviii | 27 June 1805 |
An Act for more effectually repairing, widening, and improving, the Road from Welford Bridge, in the County of Northampton, to Milston Lane, in the Town of Leicester. (Repealed by Road from Welford Bridge Act 1825 (6 Geo. 4. c. lxxxii))
| Road from Markfield Turnpike (Leicestershire) Act 1805 (repealed) | 45 Geo. 3. c. lxxix | 27 June 1805 |
An Act for enlarging the Term and Powers of Two Acts, passed in the Thirtieth Year of His late Majesty, (Note: Leicestershire Roads Act 1757 (30 Geo. 2. c. 49)) and in the Twenty-third Year of His present Majesty, (Note: Leicester Roads Act 1783 (23 Geo. 3. c. 107)) for repairing the Road from Markfield Turnpike to the Road leading from Loughborough to Ashby-de-la-Zouch, in the County of Leicester. (Repealed by Markfield Turnpike and Snape Gate Road Act 1826 (7 Geo. 4. c. cxxxiv))
| Road from Lawton to Burslem Act 1805 (repealed) | 45 Geo. 3. c. lxxx | 27 June 1805 |
An Act to continue the Term, and alter and enlarge the Powers of Two Acts, passed in the Third (Note: Lawton, Burslem and Newcastle-under-Lyme Road Act 1763 (3 Geo. 3. c. 45)) and Twenty third (Note: Chester and Stafford Roads Act 1783 (23 Geo. 3. c. 101)) Years of His present Majesty, for repairing the Road from Lawton, in the County of Chester, to Burslem and Newcastle under Lyme, in the County of Stafford, and other Roads therein mentioned. (Repealed by Lawton, Burslem and Newcastle-under-Lyme Turnpike Roads Act 1859 (22 & 23 Vict. c. lxxxvii))
| Duke of Bridgewater's Estate Act 1805 | 45 Geo. 3. c. lxxxi | 27 June 1805 |
An Act to enable the Trustees of the Will of the most Noble Francis late Duke of Bridgewater to make Grants in Fee, or for Years, at reserved Rents, of certain Parts of his Trust Estates, lying near or adjoining his Canal in the Counties of Lancaster and Chester, for the Purpose of having Buildings erected thereon, and otherwise improving the same.
| Oxford University and Earl of Radnor's Estates Act 1805 | 45 Geo. 3. c. lxxxii | 27 June 1805 |
An Act for effectuating an Exchange between the Chancellor, Masters and Scholars of the University of Oxford and the Right Honourable Jacob Earl of Radnor.
| Earl of Ormonde and Ossory's Estate Act 1805 | 45 Geo. 3. c. lxxxiii | 27 June 1805 |
An Act for vesting in new Trustees the Real Estates in Ireland, of the Right Honourable Walter Earl of Ormonde and Ossory, which have not been sold or disposed of, under and by virtue of an Act of Parliament, passed by the Parliament of Ireland in the Thirty-fifth Year of the Reign of His present Majesty, intituled, "An Act for the Sale of competent Parts of the Real Estates of the Right Honourable John Earl of Ormonde, and the Honourable Walter Butler, commonly called Lord Viscount Thurles, his eldest Son and Heir Apparent, for the Payment of Debts, Charges, and Incumbrances affecting the same; and for settling such Part and Parts thereof as shall not be sold for the Purposes aforesaid, and for other Purposes." (Note: Earl of Ormonde's Estate Act 1795 (35 Geo. 3. c. 1 Pr. (I)))
| Lord Kirkwall's Estate Act 1805 | 45 Geo. 3. c. lxxxiv | 27 June 1805 |
An Act to vest the settled Estates of John Hamilton Fitzmaurice, commonly called Lord Kirkwall, in the Counties of Denbigh and Flint, in Trustees in Trust to be sold for the Payment of Debts affecting the same, and his other settled Estates; and after Payment thereof, for the Investment of the Residue of the Monies to arise by such Sale in the Purchase of other Estates to be conveyed to the Uses of the said settled Estates, and for other Purposes therein mentioned.
| Viscount Montague's Estate Act 1805 | 45 Geo. 3. c. lxxxv | 27 June 1805 |
An Act for effecting the Sale or Exchange of certain Real Estates and Hereditaments late of George Samuel Lord Viscount Montague deceased; and laying out the Money thence arising in the Purchase of other Real Estates.
| Canterbury Cathedral's Estate Act 1805 | 45 Geo. 3. c. lxxxvi | 27 June 1805 |
An Act for enabling the Dean and Chapter of Canterbury to grant a Building Lease of certain Lands in the County of Surrey, for the Term of Ninety-nine Years, to William Clutton and Robert Boxall, pursuant to an Agreement entered into for that Purpose.
| Waller and Du Pré Estates Act 1805 | 45 Geo. 3. c. lxxxvii | 27 June 1805 |
An Act for effectuating an Exchange between Edmund Waller and James Dupré Esquires, and also an Exchange between the said Edmund Waller and the Trustees of his settled Estate; and also for vesting Part of the settled Estate of the said Edmund Waller in Trustees to be sold, and for laying out the clear Surplus of the Purchase Monies, under the Direction of the Court of Chancery, in other Estates to be settled in lieu thereof, and to the same Uses, and for other Purposes
| Ferryman's Estate Act 1805 | 45 Geo. 3. c. lxxxviii | 27 June 1805 |
An Act for vesting the devised Estates of John Ferryman Gentleman, deceased, in Trustees, to be sold, and for applying Part of the Purchase Money in Discharge of Incumbrances; and for laying out the Residue, under the Direction of the High Court of Chancery, in the Purchase of other Estates, to be settled to the same Uses, and until such Purchase be made, for laying out such Residue in the Purchase of Three per Cent. Consolidated Bank Annuities.
| Keate's Estate Act 1805 | 45 Geo. 3. c. lxxxix | 27 June 1805 |
An Act for authorizing the Trustees named in the Will of Jane Catherine Keate, Widow, to sell the Messuages and Tenements in Spital Fields, in the County of Middlesex, thereby devised, and for investing the clear Purchase Monies, under the Direction of the High Court of Chancery, in other Estates, to be settled in lieu thereof, and to the same Uses, and also for authorizing the granting of Building and Repairing Leases until Sale.
| Baillie's Estate Act 1805 | 45 Geo. 3. c. xc | 27 June 1805 |
An Act for vesting the Mansion House and Land, called Ealing Grove, (Note: Ealing Grove.) in the County of Middlesex, (Part of the Estates devised by the Will of James Baillie Esquire,) in Trustees upon Trust, to sell the same under the Directions of the Court of Chancery, and to apply the Money arising from the Sale thereof in the Purchase of other Hereditaments, to be settled to the Uses of the Will of the said James Baillie.
| Stockport Common Lands and Poor Relief Act 1805 | 45 Geo. 3. c. xci | 27 June 1805 |
An Act for dividing, and selling or disposing of, the Common Lands and Waste Grounds in the Manor, Barony, Town, and Township of Stockport, in the County Palatine of Chester, and for applying the Money to arise thereby for the Benefit of the Poor of the said Town.
| Great Canford and Poole Inclosures Act 1805 | 45 Geo. 3. c. xcii | 27 June 1805 |
An Act for inclosing Lands in the Parish of Great Canford, in the County of Dorset, and in the Town and County of the Town of Poole.
| Swallow Inclosure Act 1805 | 45 Geo. 3. c. xciii | 27 June 1805 |
An Act for inclosing Lands in the Parish of Swallow, in the County of Lincoln.
| Scarborough Improvement Act 1805 (repealed) | 45 Geo. 3. c. xciv | 2 July 1805 |
An Act for paving and otherwise improving the Streets and other Places in the Township of Scarborough, in the North Riding of the County of York; and for licensing Hackney Coaches, and establishing other Regulations in the said Township. (Repealed by Local Government Board's Provisional Orders Confirmation (No. 10) Act 1913 (3 & 4 Geo. 5. c. cxxxiv))
| Whitecross Road and Beverley Road Act 1805 (repealed) | 45 Geo. 3. c. xcv | 2 July 1805 |
An Act to continue the Term and alter and enlarge the Powers of Two Acts, passed in the First (Note: White Cross and Beverley Roads Act 1760 (1 Geo. 3. c. 42)) and Twenty second (Note: Holderness to Beverley Road Act 1782 (22 Geo. 3. c. 90)) Years of His present Majesty, for repairing the Road leading from Whitecross, in the Parish of Leven in Holderness, in the East Riding of the County of York, to the Town of Beverley in the said County. (Repealed by Whitecross and Beverley Road Act 1826 (7 Geo. 4. c. cxxvi))
| Leek Inclosure Act 1805 | 45 Geo. 3. c. xcvi | 2 July 1805 |
An Act for inclosing Lands in the Parish of Leek, in the County of Stafford.
| Hampton-in-Arden Inclosure Act 1805 | 45 Geo. 3. c. xcvii | 2 July 1805 |
An Act for inclosing Lands in the Parish of Hampton in Arden, in the County of Warwick.
| Thames Lastage and Ballastage Act 1805 (repealed) | 45 Geo. 3. c. xcviii | 10 July 1805 |
An Act to repeal Two Acts passed in the Sixth (Note: River Thames (Lastage and Ballastage) Act 1732 (6 Geo. 3. c. 29)) and Thirty second (Note: Thames, etc. Act 1758 (32 Geo. 2. c. 16)) Years of His late Majesty, for the Regulation of Lastage and Ballastage in the River Thames; and to make more effectual Regulations relating thereto. (Repealed by Thames Lastage and Ballastage Act 1843 (6 & 7 Vict. c. lvii))
| St. Pancras Poor Relief, Workhouse and Rate Collectors Act 1805 or the St. Pancras Improvement Act 1805 (repealed) | 45 Geo. 3. c. xcix | 10 July 1805 |
An Act for repealing an Act made in the Forty fourth Year of His present Majesty, intituled, "An Act for better governing, maintaining, and employing, the Poor of the Parish of Saint Pancras, in the County of Middlesex; for providing a new Workhouse for the Use of the said Parish; for appointing Collectors of the Rates; and for other Purposes therein mentioned;" (Note: St. Pancras Poor Relief, Workhouse and Rate Collectors Act 1804 (44 Geo. 3. c. xlvii)) and for making more effectual Provision for those and other Purposes. (Repealed by St. Pancras Select Vestry Act 1819 (59 Geo. 3. c. xxxix))
| All Saints Lewes Parish Church Act 1805 | 45 Geo. 3. c. c | 10 July 1805 |
An Act for rebuilding the Parish Church of All Saints, in the Town of Lewes, in the County of Sussex, and for repairing the Tower thereof.
| Ipswich Port Improvement Act 1805 (repealed) | 45 Geo. 3. c. ci | 10 July 1805 |
An Act for improving and rendering more commodious the Port of Ipswich, in the County of Sufffolk. (Repealed by Ipswich Port Act 1837 (7 Will. 4 & 1 Vict. c. lxxiv))
| Broadstairs Pier Act 1805 | 45 Geo. 3. c. cii | 10 July 1805 |
An Act for amending an Act, passed in the Thirty second Year of His present Majesty, (Note: Broadstairs Pier Act 1792 (32 Geo. 3. c. 86)) for repairing or rebuilding the Pier adjoining to the Harbour of Broadstairs, in the Isle of Thanet, in the County of Kent.
| Carmarthen Gaol, House of Correction, Water Supply, &c Act 1805 (repealed) | 45 Geo. 3. c. ciii | 10 July 1805 |
An Act to repeal so much of an Act, passed in the Thirty second Year of His present Majesty, (Note: Carmarthen Improvement Act 1792 (32 Geo. 3. c. 104)) as relates to the building a Gaol and House of Correction for the Town and County Borough of Carmarthen, and for watching and supplying the said Town with Water, and for granting further Powers for those and other Purposes relating thereto. (Repealed by Dyfed Act 1987 (c. xxiv))
| Gloucester and Berkeley Canal Act 1805 | 45 Geo. 3. c. civ | 10 July 1805 |
An Act to enable the Company of Proprietors of the Gloucester and Berkeley Canal to vary and alter the Line of a certain Part of the said Canal, and to enable the said Company to raise a further Sum of Money for carrying into Execution the several Acts for making the said Canal.
| West Riding of Yorkshire Drainage Act 1805 (repealed) | 45 Geo. 3. c. cv | 10 July 1805 |
An Act for draining and improving certain Low Grounds and Carrs, within the Parishes, Townships and Places of Selby, Brayton, Thorp Willoughby, Hambleton, Wistow, Scalm Park, Cawood, Sherburn, Lennerton, Rest Park, South Milforth and Barkston Ash, in the West Riding of the County of York. (Repealed by Selby Dam Drainage Act 1885 (48 & 49 Vict. c. clxxxv))
| Dublin Baking and Corn Trade Act 1805 | 45 Geo. 3. c. cvi | 10 July 1805 |
An Act to repeal several Acts, passed in the Parliament of Ireland, for regulating the Baking Trade in the City and County of Dublin, and Liberties thereof, and for better regulating the said Trade; and for preventing Frauds in the buying and selling of Corn.
| Wadsley and Langset Road Act 1805 (repealed) | 45 Geo. 3. c. cvii | 10 July 1805 |
An Act for making and keeping in Repair, a Carriage Road, to branch out of the Sheffield and Peniston Turnpike Road in the Township of Wadsley, in the West Riding of the County of York, to join the Doncaster and Salter's Brook Turnpike Road in the Township of Langset, in the said West Riding. (Repealed by Wadsley and Langset Turnpike Road Extension Act 1823 (4 Geo. 4. c. lxxvii))
| Road from Dunfermline to Nivingstone Act 1805 (repealed) | 45 Geo. 3. c. cviii | 10 July 1805 |
An Act for erecting Toll Bars and levying Toll Duties on the Road from Dunfermline to Nivingstone, in the Counties of Fife and Kinross, and for making a new Turnpike Road from Saline towards the North Queensferry Road, in the said County of Fife. (Repealed by Fife, Kinross, Perth and Clackmannan Roads Act 1810 (50 Geo. 3. c. lxxii))
| Road from Newnham to St. Whites (Gloucestershire) Act 1805 (repealed) | 45 Geo. 3. c. cix | 10 July 1805 |
An Act to continue the Term, and alter and enlarge the Powers of an Act, passed in the Twenty third Year of His present Majesty, (Note: Gloucester Roads Act 1783 (23 Geo. 3. c. 104)) for amending the Road leading from the Passage or Ferry over the River Severn at Newnham, to a Place called Saint White's, adjoining the Forest of Dean, in the County of Gloucester. (Repealed by Statute Law (Repeals) Act 2013 (c. 2))
| Earl of Camden and Prebendary of Cantlowes Estates Act 1805 | 45 Geo. 3. c. cx | 10 July 1805 |
An Act for confirming certain Building Leases granted by the Right Honourable Charles Earl Camden, deceased, and the Prebendary of the Prebend of Cantlowes, in the Cathedral Church of Saint Paul in London, and by the Right Honourable John Jeffreys, now Earl Camden, and the said Prebendary, and for enabling the said John Jeffreys Earl Camden and others, with the Consent of the Prebendary, to grant similar Leases in future of the Prebendal Lands of Kentish Town, in the County of Middlesex, and for rectifying a Mistake in the present Earl's Marriage Settlement relating to those Lands.
| Wimborne St. Giles and Allhallows Glebe Lands and Earl of Shaftesbury's Estate Act 1805 | 45 Geo. 3. c. cxi | 10 July 1805 |
An Act to establish and confirm an Exchange made by and between the Rector of the Parish Church of Wimborne Saint Giles and Alhallows, in the County of Dorset, and the Right Honourable Anthony Ashley Earl of Shaftesbury, of Part of his Glebe Lands, and other Lands held and enjoyed with the said Rectory, for other Lands there, the Property of the said Earl, which are more conveniently situated for the said Rector and his Successors.
| Mawbey's Estate Act 1805 | 45 Geo. 3. c. cxii | 10 July 1805 |
An Act for vesting certain Estates late belonging to and devised by the Will of Sir Joseph Mawbey Baronet, deceased, in Trustees, to be sold, and for applying the Monies arising from the Sale thereof in the Discharge of Incumbrances and Debts, and for laying out the Surplus in the Purchase of other Estates, to be settled to the same Uses.
| Bishop of London's (Paddington) Estate Act 1805 | 45 Geo. 3. c. cxiii | 10 July 1805 |
An Act for enlarging the Powers of an Act, passed in the Thirty fifth Year of the Reign of His present Majesty, intituled "An Act for enabling the Lord Bishop of London to grant a Lease, with Powers of Renewal, of Lands in the Parish of Paddington, in the County of Middlesex, for the Purpose of building upon." (Note: Bishop of London's (Paddington) Estate Act 1795 (35 Geo. 3. c. 83 Pr.))
| Legard's Estate Act 1805 | 45 Geo. 3. c. cxiv | 10 July 1805 |
An Act for vesting Part of the settled Estates of Sir John Legard Baronet, in Trustees, to be sold, with the Approbation of the High Court of Chancery, and for applying Part of the Purchase Monies in paying off Incumbrances on such Estates, and in reimbursing to him the Sums required by the Commissioners acting in the Execution of several Acts for inclosing and draining such Estates, and for laying out the Residue of the Purchase Monies in the Purchase of other Estates, to be settled to the former Uses.
| Canterbury Cathedral and Brandon's Estate Act 1805 | 45 Geo. 3. c. cxv | 10 July 1805 |
An Act for confirming certain Building Leases of Lands in Walworth, in the Parish of Saint Mary Newington, in the County of Surrey, granted by the Dean and Chapter of Canterbury, jointly with their Lessees, Henry Penton Esquire, and Samuel Brandon and Thomas Brandon Esquires, contrary to the Provisions of an Act made in the Fourteenth Year of the Reign of His present Majesty, (Note: Canterbury Cathedral Estate Act 1774 (14 Geo. 3. c. 43 Pr.)) and for establishing Exchanges of Three Small Pieces of Freehold and Leasehold Lands between the said Dean and Chapter and the said Samuel Brandon, and the Trustees under the Will of the said Thomas Brandon, deceased; and for empowering the said Dean and Chapter, and their Lessees for the time being of their Estates in Walworth, to grant Building Leases of Parts of the said Premises, and for other the Purposes therein mentioned.
| Huttons Ambo Inclosure Act 1805 | 45 Geo. 3. c. cxvi | 10 July 1805 |
An Act for confirming and establishing the Award and Decree made and passed on the Division and Inclosure of Lands in the Township of Hutton's Ambo, in the North Riding of the County of York.
| Thames Tunnel (Wapping and Rotherhithe) Act 1805 | 45 Geo. 3. c. cxvii | 12 July 1805 |
An Act for making and maintaining an Archway or Archways under the River Thames from the Parish of Saint Mary Rotherhithe, in the County of Surrey to the opposite Side of the said River, in the County of Middlesex.
| Maidstone Poor Relief Act 1805 | 45 Geo. 3. c. cxviii | 12 July 1805 |
An Act to alter amend and enlarge the Powers of an Act passed in the Twentieth Year of His present Majesty, (Note: Maidstone (Poor Relief) Act 1780 (20 Geo. 3. c. 22)) for the better Government and Regulation of the Poor in the Town and Parish of Maidstone, in the County of Kent.
| South London Waterworks Act 1805 (repealed) | 45 Geo. 3. c. cxix | 12 July 1805 |
An Act for supplying the Inhabitants of the Parish of Saint Giles Camberwell, and Parts of the Parish of Saint Mary's Lambeth, and several other Parishes and Places in the County of Surrey, with Water. (Repealed by Southwark and Vauxhall Water Company Act 1845 (8 & 9 Vict. c. lxix))

=== Private acts ===
| Short title | Citation | Royal assent |
Long title
| Winter's Naturalization Act 1805 | 45 Geo. 3. c. 1 Pr. | 7 February 1805 |
An Act for naturalizing Henry Julius Winter.
| Trimley, &c. Inclosure Act 1805 | 45 Geo. 3. c. 2 Pr. | 22 February 1805 |
An Act for inclosing Lands in the Parishes of Trimley Saint Mary, Trimley Saint Martin, Kirton, and Nacton, in the County of Suffolk.
| Halsey's Name Act 1805 | 45 Geo. 3. c. 3 Pr. | 22 February 1805 |
An Act to enable Joseph Thompson Whateley Esquire, and Sarah his Wife, and their respective Issue, to take and use the Surname and Arms of Halsey pursuant to the Will of Frederick Halsey Esquire, deceased.
| Antony's Naturalization Act 1805 | 45 Geo. 3. c. 4 Pr. | 18 March 1805 |
An Act for naturalizing John Antony.
| Lord John Thynne's Indemnity Act 1805 | 45 Geo. 3. c. 5 Pr. | 22 March 1805 |
An Act to relieve the Right Honourable John Thynne, commonly called Lord John Thynne, who was elected to serve in this present Parliament for the City of Bath, from certain Penalties and Disabilities which he has incurred by fitting and voting in the House of Commons without having taken the Oaths, and in other Respects conformed to the Laws in such Case made and provided.
| Geller's Naturalization Act 1805 | 45 Geo. 3. c. 6 Pr. | 22 March 1805 |
An Act for naturalizing John Gerard Geller.
| Muller's Naturalization Act 1805 | 45 Geo. 3. c. 7 Pr. | 22 March 1805 |
An Act for naturalizing John Fredrick Muller.
| Malonek's Naturalization Act 1805 | 45 Geo. 3. c. 8 Pr. | 22 March 1805 |
An Act for naturalizing John Michael Malonek.
| Leukfeld's Naturalization Act 1805 | 45 Geo. 3. c. 9 Pr. | 22 March 1805 |
An Act for naturalizing Ludewig August Leukfeld.
| Masius's Naturalization Act 1805 | 45 Geo. 3. c. 10 Pr. | 22 March 1805 |
An Act for naturalizing Christian William Masius.
| Wolf's Naturalization Act 1805 | 45 Geo. 3. c. 11 Pr. | 22 March 1805 |
An Act for naturalizing Friederick Gottlieb Wolf.
| Great Braxted Inclosure Act 1805 | 45 Geo. 3. c. 12 Pr. | 25 March 1805 |
An Act for inclosing Lands in the Parish of Great Braxted, in the County of Essex.
| West Newton Inclosure Act 1805 | 45 Geo. 3. c. 13 Pr. | 5 April 1805 |
An Act for inclosing Lands in the Parish of West Newton, in the County of Norfolk.
| Woodward's Name Act 1805 | 45 Geo. 3. c. 14 Pr. | 5 April 1805 |
An Act to enable Daniel Henry Woodward, Esquire, and his Sons and their Issue and Descendants, to use the Surnames of Lee Warner, and to use the Arms of the Family of Henry Lee Warner Esquire, deceased, pursuant to the Will of the said Henry Lee Warner.
| Luning's Naturalization Act 1805 | 45 Geo. 3. c. 15 Pr. | 5 April 1805 |
An Act for naturalizing Jacob William Luning.
| Linschoten's Naturalization Act 1805 | 45 Geo. 3. c. 16 Pr. | 5 April 1805 |
An Act for naturalizing Francis Albert Leonard Strick van Linschoten.
| Hulle's Naturalization Act 1805 | 45 Geo. 3. c. 17 Pr. | 5 April 1805 |
An Act for naturalizing Jacob Hulle.
| Mertens' Naturalization Act 1805 | 45 Geo. 3. c. 18 Pr. | 5 April 1805 |
An Act for naturalizing Herman Mertens.
| Palling Inclosure Act 1805 | 45 Geo. 3. c. 19 Pr. | 10 April 1805 |
An Act for inclosing Lands in the Parish of Palling, in the County of Norfolk.
| Brunstead Inclosure Act 1805 | 45 Geo. 3. c. 20 Pr. | 10 April 1805 |
An Act for inclosing Lands in the Parish of Brunstead, in the County of Norfolk.
| Lea and Cleaverton Inclosure Act 1805 | 45 Geo. 3. c. 21 Pr. | 10 April 1805 |
An Act for inclosing Lands in the Parish of Lea and Cleaverton, in the County of Wilts.
| Pons' Naturalization Act 1805 | 45 Geo. 3. c. 22 Pr. | 10 April 1805 |
An Act for naturalizing James Samuel Pons.
| Vos's Naturalization Act 1805 | 45 Geo. 3. c. 23 Pr. | 10 April 1805 |
An Act for naturalizing Hermanus Vos.
| Thurleigh Inclosure Act 1805 | 45 Geo. 3. c. 24 Pr. | 11 April 1805 |
An Act for inclosing Lands in the Parish of Thurleigh, in the County of Bedford.
| Swaton Inclosure Act 1805 | 45 Geo. 3. c. 25 Pr. | 11 April 1805 |
An Act for inclosing Lands in the Parish of Swaton, in the County of Lincoln.
| Cherington Inclosure Act 1805 | 45 Geo. 3. c. 26 Pr. | 11 April 1805 |
An Act for inclosing Lands in the Manor and Parish of Cherington, in the County of Warwick.
| Sudborne Inclosure Act 1805 | 45 Geo. 3. c. 27 Pr. | 17 May 1805 |
An Act for inclosing Lands in the Parish of Sudborne, in the County of Suffolk.
| Fareham Inclosure Act 1805 | 45 Geo. 3. c. 28 Pr. | 17 May 1805 |
An Act for inclosing Lands in the Parish of Fareham, in the County of Southampton.
| Gillingham, &c. Inclosure Act 1805 | 45 Geo. 3. c. 29 Pr. | 17 May 1805 |
An Act for inclosing Lands in the Parishes of Gillingham Saint Mary, Gillingham All Saints, Winston, and Windell, in the County of Norfolk.
| Rushock Inclosure Act 1805 | 45 Geo. 3. c. 30 Pr. | 17 May 1805 |
An Act for inclosing Lands in the Parish of Rushock, in the County of Worcester.
| Stilton Inclosure Act 1805 | 45 Geo. 3. c. 31 Pr. | 17 May 1805 |
An Act for inclosing Lands in the Parish of Stilton, in the County of Huntingdon.
| Blidworth Inclosure Act 1805 | 45 Geo. 3. c. 32 Pr. | 17 May 1805 |
An Act for inclosing Lands in the Parish of Blidworth, in the County of Nottingham.
| Ellesmere Inclosure Act 1805 | 45 Geo. 3. c. 33 Pr. | 17 May 1805 |
An Act for inclosing the Commons called The Perthy and New Marton Common, in the Parish of Ellesmere, in the County of Salop.
| Cranford St. John Inclosure Act 1805 | 45 Geo. 3. c. 34 Pr. | 17 May 1805 |
An Act for inclosing Lands in the Manor and Parish of Cranford Saint John, in the County of Northampton.
| Milverton Inclosure Act 1805 | 45 Geo. 3. c. 35 Pr. | 17 May 1805 |
An Act for inclosing Lands in the Parish of Milverton, in the County of Warwick.
| Rucker's Naturalization Act 1805 | 45 Geo. 3. c. 36 Pr. | 17 May 1805 |
An Act for naturalizing Henry John Rucker.
| Gautier's Naturalization Act 1805 | 45 Geo. 3. c. 37 Pr. | 17 May 1805 |
An Act for naturalizing John Guy Gautier, John Lewes Frederic Gautier, and Dennis Benjamin Charlery.
| Huguenin's Naturalization Act 1805 | 45 Geo. 3. c. 38 Pr. | 17 May 1805 |
An Act for naturalizing Henry Huguenin.
| Schweickhert's Naturalization Act 1805 | 45 Geo. 3. c. 39 Pr. | 17 May 1805 |
An Act for naturalizing Schweickhert Schweickhert.
| Hommey's Naturalization Act 1805 | 45 Geo. 3. c. 40 Pr. | 17 May 1805 |
An Act for naturalizing Matews Thomas Francis Hommey.
| Dege's Naturalization Act 1805 | 45 Geo. 3. c. 41 Pr. | 17 May 1805 |
An Act for naturalizing John Henoch Christian Dege.
| Arundel Estate Act 1805 | 45 Geo. 3. c. 42 Pr. | 5 June 1805 |
An Act for vesting a Farm and Hereditaments in the Parish of Petworth in the County of Sussex, and in the Parish of Ealing in the County of Southampton, (Parcel of the Estates entailed with the Castle and Manor of Arundel, by the Act of Parliament made in the Third Year of the Reign of King Charles the First) (Note: Earl of Arundel's Dignity and Estate Act 1627 (3 Cha. 1. c. 4 Pr.)) in Trustees, upon Trust, to sell, and for laying out the Monies in the Purchase of a more convenient Estate.
| Graham's Estate Act 1805 | 45 Geo. 3. c. 43 Pr. | 5 June 1805 |
An Act for settling and securing certain Parts and Portions of the Lands and Barony of Gorthy and others lying in the County of Perth, to and in favour of Thomas Graham Esquire, of Balgowan, and a certain Series of Heirs in Fee Tail, and in lieu thereof for vesting the Lands of Meckven and others lying in the County of Perth aforesaid, in the said Thomas Graham, his Heirs and Assigns, in Fee simple.
| Finedon Inclosure Act 1805 | 45 Geo. 3. c. 44 Pr. | 5 June 1805 |
An Act for inclosing Lands in the Parish of Thingdon, otherwise Finedon, in the County of Northampton.
| Shirburn Inclosure Act 1805 | 45 Geo. 3. c. 45 Pr. | 5 June 1805 |
An Act for inclosing Lands in the Parish of Shirburn, in the County of Oxford.
| Colsterworth Inclosure Act 1805 | 45 Geo. 3. c. 46 Pr. | 5 June 1805 |
An Act for inclosing Lands in the Parish of Colsterworth, in the County of Lincoln, and for making Compensation for the Tythes arising within the same Parish.
| Plumptree Inclosure Act 1805 | 45 Geo. 3. c. 47 Pr. | 5 June 1805 |
An Act for inclosing Lands in the Parish of Plumptree, in the County of Nottingham.
| Methwold Inclosure Act 1805 | 45 Geo. 3. c. 48 Pr. | 5 June 1805 |
An Act for inclosing Lands in the Parish of Methwold, in the County of Norfolk.
| Pyrford Inclosure Act 1805 | 45 Geo. 3. c. 49 Pr. | 5 June 1805 |
An Act for inclosing Lands in the Manor of Pyrford, in the Parishes of Pyrford and Chertsey, or One of them, in the County of Surrey.
| Darfield Inclosure Act 1805 | 45 Geo. 3. c. 50 Pr. | 5 June 1805 |
An Act for inclosing Lands in the Township of Darfield, in the West Riding of the County of York.
| Alford Inclosure Act 1805 | 45 Geo. 3. c. 51 Pr. | 5 June 1805 |
An Act for inclosing Lands in the Parish of Alford, in the County of Somerset.
| Mareham-on-the-Hill Inclosure Act 1805 | 45 Geo. 3. c. 52 Pr. | 5 June 1805 |
An Act for inclosing Lands in the Parish of Mareham on the Hill in the County of Lincoln.
| Dopcke's Naturalization Act 1805 | 45 Geo. 3. c. 53 Pr. | 5 June 1805 |
An Act for naturalizing George James Dopeke.
| Warin's Naturalization Act 1805 | 45 Geo. 3. c. 54 Pr. | 5 June 1805 |
An Act for naturalizing Nicholas Warin.
| Lorck's Naturalization Act 1805 | 45 Geo. 3. c. 55 Pr. | 5 June 1805 |
An Act for naturalizing Christopher Lorck.
| Greene's Estate Act 1805 | 45 Geo. 3. c. 56 Pr. | 27 June 1805 |
An Act for vesting certain Parts of the Estates late of Mary Greene, Widow, deceased, situate in the County of Norfolk, and by her Will devised or limited to strict Uses, in Trustees to be sold, and for applying Part of the Monies arising from the Sale thereof in Discharge of an Incumbrance subsisting thereon, and for laying out the Residue of such Monies in the Purchase of other Estates, to be settled to the same Uses.
| Coxwell's Estate Act 1805 | 45 Geo. 3. c. 57 Pr. | 27 June 1805 |
An Act for vesting certain Trust Estates in the Trustees of the Settlement executed on the Marriage of Henry Coxwell Esquire, and Margaret his Wife.
| Smith's Estate Act 1805 | 45 Geo. 3. c. 58 Pr. | 27 June 1805 |
An Act for vesting in Thomas Roper of Bishopsgate Street, in the City of London, Builder, a Messuage, with the Appurtenances, in Little Saint Helens, in the said City of London, the Estate of Mary Smith, an Infant, and for applying the Purchase Money for the same in the Manner therein directed.
| Broadmaine Inclosure Act 1805 | 45 Geo. 3. c. 59 Pr. | 27 June 1805 |
An Act for inclosing Lands in the Parish of Broadmaine, in the County of Dorset.
| Whichford Inclosure Act 1805 | 45 Geo. 3. c. 60 Pr. | 27 June 1805 |
An Act for inclosing Lands in the Hamlets of Whichford, Ascott, and Stowerton, in the Parish of Whichford, in the County of Warwick.
| New Alresford Inclosure Act 1805 | 45 Geo. 3. c. 61 Pr. | 27 June 1805 |
An Act for inclosing Lands in the Parish of New Alresford, in the County of Southampton.
| St. Mary-on-the-Hill Inclosure Act 1805 | 45 Geo. 3. c. 62 Pr. | 27 June 1805 |
An Act for inclosing Lands in the Parish of Saint Mary on the Hill, in the City and County Palatine of Chester.
| Fransham, &c. Inclosure Act 1805 | 45 Geo. 3. c. 63 Pr. | 27 June 1805 |
An Act for inclosing Lands in the Parishes of Great Fransham, Little Fransham, and North Pickenham in the County of Norfolk.
| Scoulton Inclosure Act 1805 | 45 Geo. 3. c. 64 Pr. | 27 June 1805 |
An Act for inclosing Lands in the Parish of Scoulton, in the County of Norfolk.
| Byersgreen Moor Inclosure Act 1805 | 45 Geo. 3. c. 65 Pr. | 27 June 1805 |
An Act for inclosing Lands in the Townships of Byersgreen and Old Park, in the County of Durham.
| Threshfield, &c. Inclosure Act 1805 | 45 Geo. 3. c. 66 Pr. | 27 June 1805 |
An Act for inclosing Lands in the Township of Threshfield and Skirethorns, and Burnsal, in the West Riding of the County of York.
| Tredington Inclosure Act 1805 | 45 Geo. 3. c. 67 Pr. | 27 June 1805 |
An Act for inclosing Lands in the Parish of Tredington, in the County of Gloucester.
| Faenol Inclosure Act 1805 | 45 Geo. 3. c. 68 Pr. | 27 June 1805 |
An Act for inclosing embanking draining and improving certain Lands in the Township of Faenol, in the Parish of Towyn, in the County of Merioneth.
| Ryhill, &c. Inclosure Act 1805 | 45 Geo. 3. c. 69 Pr. | 27 June 1805 |
An Act for inclosing Lands in the Townships or Hamlets of Ryhill and Camerton, in the East Riding of the County of York; and for making Compensation for the Tythes thereof, and also for the Tythes of the ancient inclosed Lands within the said Townships or Hamlets.
| Broadwater Inclosure Act 1805 | 45 Geo. 3. c. 70 Pr. | 27 June 1805 |
An Act for inclosing Lands in the Parish of Broadwater, in the County of Sussex.
| Briningham, &c. Inclosure Act 1805 | 45 Geo. 3. c. 71 Pr. | 27 June 1805 |
An Act for inclosing Lands in the Parishes of Briningham, Stody, and Brinton in the County of Norfolk.
| Bramhope Inclosure Act 1805 | 45 Geo. 3. c. 72 Pr. | 27 June 1805 |
An Act for inclosing Lands in the Manor and Township of Bramhope, in the Parish of Otley, in the West Riding of the County of York.
| Snalewell Inclosure Act 1805 | 45 Geo. 3. c. 73 Pr. | 27 June 1805 |
An Act for dividing and allotting Lands in the Parish of Snalewell, in the County of Cambridge.
| Norton Bavant, &c. Inclosure Act 1805 | 45 Geo. 3. c. 74 Pr. | 27 June 1805 |
An Act for dividing certain Lands in the Parish of Norton Bavant, in the County of Wilts.
| Bainbridge Inclosure Act 1805 | 45 Geo. 3. c. 75 Pr. | 27 June 1805 |
An Act for inclosing Lands in the Manor of Bainbridge and Parish of Aisgarth, in the County of York.
| Weston's Divorce Act 1805 | 45 Geo. 3. c. 76 Pr. | 27 June 1805 |
An Act to dissolve the Marriage of Thomas Weston Esquire with Frances Mary Lenn his now Wife, and to enable him to marry again; and tor other Purposes therein mentioned.
| Brune's Naturalization Act 1805 | 45 Geo. 3. c. 77 Pr. | 27 June 1805 |
An Act for naturalizing John Henry Brune.
| Borrell's Naturalization Act 1805 | 45 Geo. 3. c. 78 Pr. | 27 June 1805 |
An Act for naturalizing John Henry Borrell.
| Flindt's Naturalization Act 1805 | 45 Geo. 3. c. 79 Pr. | 27 June 1805 |
An Act for naturalizing Gustavus Flindt.
| De Stein's Naturalization Act 1805 | 45 Geo. 3. c. 80 Pr. | 27 June 1805 |
An Act for naturalizing Caroline Ernestine Frederica Sophia Baroness De Stein, of Nordheim, in the Empire of Germany, Wife of John Charles Mellish Esquire.
| Ströbel's Naturalization Act 1805 | 45 Geo. 3. c. 81 Pr. | 27 June 1805 |
An Act for naturalizing Georg Conradt Ströbel.
| Eschke's Naturalization Act 1805 | 45 Geo. 3. c. 82 Pr. | 27 June 1805 |
An Act for naturalizing Christian August Eschke.
| Appold's Naturalization Act 1805 | 45 Geo. 3. c. 83 Pr. | 27 June 1805 |
An Act for naturalizing Christian Appold.
| Gottreux's Naturalization Act 1805 | 45 Geo. 3. c. 84 Pr. | 27 June 1805 |
An Act for naturalizing Joshua Gottreux.
| La Marche's Naturalization Act 1805 | 45 Geo. 3. c. 85 Pr. | 27 June 1805 |
An Act for naturalizing John Bernhard la Marche.
| Chearsley Inclosure Act 1805 | 45 Geo. 3. c. 86 Pr. | 2 July 1805 |
An Act for inclosing Lands in the Parish of Chearsley, in the County of Buckingham.
| Bathwick Bridge Act 1805 or Pulteney's Estate Act 1805 (repealed) | 45 Geo. 3. c. 87 Pr. | 10 July 1805 |
An Act to enable the Trustees therein named to erect and build a new Bridge over the River Avon, on the North West Side of the Manor of Bath Wick, in the County of Somerset, to communicate with the Parish of Walcot, and the Road from the City of Bath to London; and also to raise a sufficient Sum of Money for that Purpose, by a Charge on the Trust Estates (Note: The Bathwick Estate.) of the late General Pulteney. (Note: Harry Pulteney.) (Repealed by Bath Corporation Act 1925 (15 & 16 Geo. 5. c. xciii))
| Allardice's Estate Act 1805 | 45 Geo. 3. c. 88 Pr. | 10 July 1805 |
An Act for settling and securing certain Parts of the Lands of Redcloak and Findlayston, lying in the Parish of Fetteresso and County of Kincardine, upon and to and in favour of Robert Barclay Allardice, of Urie, Esquire, and the same Series of Heirs, and under the same Conditions and Limitations as are mentioned and contained in a Deed of Entail made by Robert Barclay of Urie, deceased; and for vesting in the said Robert Barclay Allardice, and his Heirs and Assigns, in Fee Simple, certain Parts of the Barony of Urie, lying in the said County of Kincardine.
| Anderby Inclosure Act 1805 | 45 Geo. 3. c. 89 Pr. | 10 July 1805 |
An Act for inclosing Lands in the Parish of Anderby, in the County of Lincoln.
| Frolesworth Inclosure Act 1805 | 45 Geo. 3. c. 90 Pr. | 10 July 1805 |
An Act for inclosing Lands in Frolesworth in the County of Leicester.
| Somerford Keynes Inclosure Act 1805 | 45 Geo. 3. c. 91 Pr. | 10 July 1805 |
An Act for inclosing Lands in the Parish of Somerford Keynes, in the County of Wilts.
| Aldbourn Inclosure Act 1805 | 45 Geo. 3. c. 92 Pr. | 10 July 1805 |
An Act for allotting Lands in the Parish of Aldbourn, otherwise Aldborne, otherwise Alborne, in the County of Wilts.
| East Malling, &c. Inclosure Act 1805 | 45 Geo. 3. c. 93 Pr. | 10 July 1805 |
An Act for inclosing Lands in the Parishes of East Malling and Teston, in the County of Kent.
| Claughton Moor Inclosure Act 1805 | 45 Geo. 3. c. 94 Pr. | 10 July 1805 |
An Act for inclosing a certain Tract or Parcel of Moor, Common or Waste Ground, called Claughton Moor, within and Parcel of the Manor of Claughton in Lonsdale, in the County Palatine of Lancaster, and for converting the same into a Stinted Pasture.
| Manton Inclosure Act 1805 | 45 Geo. 3. c. 95 Pr. | 10 July 1805 |
An Act for inclosing Lands in the Lordship of Manton, otherwise Maunton, in the County of Lincoln.
| Harmondsworth Inclosure Act 1805 | 45 Geo. 3. c. 96 Pr. | 10 July 1805 |
An Act for inclosing Lands in the Parish of Harmondsworth, in the County of Middlesex.
| Swaffham Prior Inclosure Act 1805 | 45 Geo. 3. c. 97 Pr. | 10 July 1805 |
An Act for inclosing Lands in the Township of Swaffham Prior, in the County of Cambridge.
| Gardner's Divorce Act 1805 | 45 Geo. 3. c. 98 Pr. | 10 July 1805 |
An Act to dissolve the Marriage of the Honourable Alan Hyde Gardner with Maria Elizabeth Adderley, and to enable him to marry again; and for other Purposes therein mentioned.
| Moore's Divorce Act 1805 | 45 Geo. 3. c. 99 Pr. | 10 July 1805 |
An Act to dissolve the Marriage of John Moore with Barbara Brabason his now Wife, and to enable him to marry again; and for other Purposes therein mentioned.
| Lingham's Divorce Act 1805 | 45 Geo. 3. c. 100 Pr. | 10 July 1805 |
An Act to dissolve the Marriage of William Lingham the younger, with Eliza Lingham his now Wife, and to enable him to marry again; and for other Purposes therein mentioned.
| Luppino's Naturalization Act 1805 | 45 Geo. 3. c. 101 Pr. | 10 July 1805 |
An Act for naturalizing Thomas Luppino.
| Dulwich Inclosure Act 1805 | 45 Geo. 3. c. 102 Pr. | 12 July 1805 |
An Act for inclosing Lands in the Manor of Dulwich, in the County of Surrey.
| Chelmorton, &c. Inclosure Act 1805 | 45 Geo. 3. c. 103 Pr. | 12 July 1805 |
An Act for inclosing Lands in the Hamlets of Chelmorton and Flagg, in the Parish of Bakewell, in the County of Derby.
| Enford, &c. Inclosure Act 1805 | 45 Geo. 3. c. 104 Pr. | 12 July 1805 |
An Act for inclosing Lands in the Tythings of Enford, Fifield, Coombe, Longstreet, and East Chisenbury, in the Parish of Enford in the County of Wilts.
| Cherry Orton and Alwalton Inclosure Act 1805 | 45 Geo. 3. c. 105 Pr. | 12 July 1805 |
An Act for inclosing Lands in the Parishes of Cherry Orton otherwise Overton Watervile, and Alwalton, in the County of Huntingdon.

=== Sources ===
- The Statutes of the United Kingdom of Great Britain and Ireland. Vol. 3: Containing the Acts 45 Geo. III. (1805) and 46 Geo. III. (1806). London: Eyre and Strahan. 1823 – via Google Books.
- The Statutes of the United Kingdom of Great Britain and Ireland. Vol. the Second. From A.D. 1804, 44 George III To A.D. 1806, 46 George III. Eyre and Strahan. 1807 – via Google Books.
- A Collection of the Public General Statutes passed in the Forty Fifth Year of the Reign of His Majesty King George the Third. Eyre and Strahan. 1805 – via Google Books.
- Pickering, Danby, ed. (1805). The Statutes at Large. Vol. XLV Part 1: Anno Quadragesimo Quarto Georgii III Regis. Cambridge: Cambridge University Press – via Google Books.
- Journal of the House of Commons. Vol. 60. London: His Majesty's Stationery Office. pp. 3–498 – via Google Books.
- Chronological Table of and Index to the Statutes. Vol. 1: To the End of the Session 59 Vict. Sess. 2 (1895) (13th ed.). London: Her Majesty's Stationery Office. 1896. pp. 180–182 – via Google Books.
- "Statutes of the United Kingdom of Great Britain and Ireland, 1805". Irish Statute Book. Office of the Attorney General, Government of Ireland.
- "Primary Legislation from 1805". legislation.gov.uk. The National Archives.

== See also ==
- List of acts of the Parliament of the United Kingdom
