= Excise Permit Act 1832 =

Act of the Parliament of the United Kingdom

Excise Permit Act 1832 (Note: The citation of this act by this short title was authorised by section 1 of, and the first schedule to, the Short Titles Act 1896. Due to the repeal of those provisions it is now authorised by section 19(2) of the Interpretation Act 1978.)
- Act of Parliament
- Parliament of the United Kingdom
- Long title: An Act to consolidate and amend the Laws regulating the granting and issuing of Permits for the Removal of Goods under the Laws of Excise.
- Citation: 2 & 3 Will. 4. c. 16
- Territorial extent: United Kingdom

Dates
- Royal assent: 24 March 1832
- Commencement: 1 April 1832 (Note: Section 23.)
- Repealed: 5 November 1993

Other legislation
- Amends: See § Repealed enactments
- Repeals/revokes: See § Repealed enactments
- Amended by: Forgery Act 1913; Customs and Excise Act 1952
- Repealed by: Statute Law (Repeals) Act 1993

Status: Repealed

Text of statute as originally enacted

Revised text of statute as amended

The Excise Permit Act 1832 (2 & 3 Will. 4. c. 16) was an act of the Parliament of the United Kingdom that consolidated enactments related to excise permits in the United Kingdom.

== Provisions ==
=== Repealed enactments ===
Section 20 of the act repealed 2 enactments, listed in that section.

Citation	Short title	Description	Extent of repeal
23 Geo. 3. c. 70	Excise Act 1783	An Act passed in the Twenty-third Year of the Reign of "His Majesty King George the Third, intituled An Act for the more .effectually preventing the illegal Importation of foreign spirits, and for putting a Stop to the private Distillation of British-made Spirituous Liquors; for explaining such Part of an Act imposing a Duty upon Male Servants as relates to the Right of Appeal from the Justices of Peace; to amend and rectify a Mistake made in an Act of the last Session of Parliament with respect to the Removal of Tea from one Part of this Kingdom to other Parts thereof; and for preventing vexatious Actions against Officers of Excise acting in pursuance of the Authority given by Excise Statutes.	As relates to Permits, and all and every Provision in any Act or Acts relating to the Excise contained for regulating the general Form and issuing of Permits for the Removal and Conveyance of exciseable Commodities, for which similar Provision is in and by this Act made.
59 Geo. 3. c. 107	Permits, etc. (Ireland) Act 1819	An Act passed in the Fifty-ninth Year of the Reign of His Majesty King George the Third, intituled An Act to consolidate and amend several Acts for regulating the granting of Permits and Certificates for the Conveyance and Protection of certain Goods in Ireland.	As relates to Permits, and all and every Provision in any Act or Acts relating to the Excise contained for regulating the general Form and issuing of Permits for the Removal and Conveyance of exciseable Commodities, for which similar Provision is in and by this Act made.

== Subsequent developments ==
The whole act, except section 12, was repealed by section 320(1) of, and part I of the twelfth schedule to, the Customs and Excise Act 1952 (15 & 16 Geo. 6 & 1 Eliz. 2. c. 44), which came into force on 1 January 1953.

The whole act was repealed by section 1(1) of, and group 1 of part IX of schedule 1 to, the Statute Law (Repeals) Act 1993, which came into force on 5 November 1993.
