= Permits, etc. (Ireland) Act 1819 =

Act of the Parliament of the United Kingdom

- Act of Parliament
- Parliament of the United Kingdom
- Long title: An Act to consolidate and amend several Acts for regulating the granting of Permits and Certificates for the Conveyance and Protection of certain Goods in Ireland.
- Citation: 59 Geo. 3. c. 107
- Territorial extent: United Kingdom

Dates
- Royal assent: 12 July 1819
- Commencement: 1 January 1820 (Note: Section 48.)
- Repealed: 16 July 1874
Other legislation
Amends	See § Repealed enactments
Repeals/revokes	See § Repealed enactments
Amended by	Excise Permit Act 1832
Repealed by	Statute Law Revision Act 1874

Status: Repealed

Text of statute as originally enacted

The Permits, etc. (Ireland) Act 1819 (59 Geo. 3. c. 107) was an act of the Parliament of the United Kingdom that consolidated enactments relating to the granting of certificate for the conveyance and protection of goods in Ireland.

== Provisions ==
=== Repealed enactments ===
Section 1 of the act repealed 7 enactments, listed in that section, from and after the commencement of the act.

Citation	Short title	Description	Extent of repeal
40 Geo. 3. c. 68 (I)	Exciseable Goods Permits Act 1800	An Act made in the Parliament of Ireland in the Fortieth Year of His present Majesty's Reign intituled An Act for better regulating the issuing and granting of Permits and Certificates for the Conveyance and Protection of certain Exciseable Goods therein mentioned and to prevent Frauds by Dealers in or Retailers of such Goods.	The whole act.
45 Geo. 3. c. 39	Spirits Act 1805	An Act made in the Parliament of the United Kingdom of Great Britain and Ireland in the Forty fifth Year of His said Majesty's Reign intituled An Act to continue until the Twenty ninth Day of September One thousand eight hundred and five and amend an Act made in the Parliament of Ireland in the Fortieth Year of His present Majesty for better regulating the issuing and granting of Permits and Certificates for the Conveyance and Protection of certain Excisfeable Goods therein mentioned and to prevent Frauds by Dealers in or Retailers of fuch Goods, so far as the same respects Permits for Spirits or Spirituous Liquors.	The whole act.
48 Geo. 3. c. 81	Duties on Spirits (Ireland) Act 1808	An Act made in the Forty eighth Year of His said Majesty's Reign intituled An Act to make perpetual and to amend several Acts for the better regulating the issuing and granting of Permits and Certificates for the Conveyance and Protection of certain Exciseable Goods in Ireland.	The whole act.
37 Geo. 3. c. 42	Tobacco Act 1797	An Act made in the Parliament of Ireland in the Thirty seventh Year of His said Majesty's Reign intituled An All for regulating and extending the Tobacco Trade and for securing the Duties payable upon the Import and Manufacture of Tobacco.	As in any way relates or relate to or concern Permits for Exciseable Commodities or Certificates of such Permits or Requisitions or Request Notes for Permits or Certificates.
39 Geo. 3. c. 32	Sweets, Mead, and Vinegar Duties Act 1799	An Act made in the Parliament of Ireland in the Thirty ninth Year of His present Majesty's Reign intituled An Act for granting unto His Majesty the several Duties therein mentioned on Sweets or made Wines Mead and Vinegar and for securing the Collection thereof.	As in any way relates or relate to or concern Permits for Exciseable Commodities or Certificates of such Permits or Requisitions or Request Notes for Permits or Certificates.
43 Geo. 3. 97	Collection of Revenue (Ireland) (No. 2) Act 1803	An Act made in the Parliament of the said United Kingdom in the Forty third Year of His said Majesty's Reign intituled An Act to amend several Ads of Parliament for the better Collection and Security of His Majesty's Revenue of Customs and Excise in Ireland and for preventing Frauds therein and to make further Regulations relating thereto.	As in any way relates or relate to or concern Permits for Exciseable Commodities or Certificates of such Permits or Requisitions or Request Notes for Permits or Certificates.
55 Geo. 3. c. 104	Spirits (Ireland) (No. 2) Act 1815	One other Act made in the Fifty fifth Year of His present Majesty's Reign intituled An Act to make further Provisions for the issuing of Licences to Persons to deal in retail make or manufacture Spirits and other Exciseable Commodities in Ireland and for securing the Duties of Excise payable by the Persons so licensed and the said hereinbefore recited Acts of the Fortieth Forty fifth and Forty eighth Years aforesaid.	As in any way relates or relate to or concern Permits for Exciseable Commodities or Certificates of such Permits or Requisitions or Request Notes for Permits or Certificates.

Section 2 of the act repealed 1 enactment, listed in that section, from 1 August 1819.

Citation	Short title	Description	Extent of repeal
55 Geo. 3. c. 82	Customs, etc. Act 1815	An Act made in the Parliament of the United Kingdom in the Fifty fifth Year of His present Majesty's Reign intituled An Act to grant Duties of Customs and to allow Drawbacks and Bounties on certain Goods Wares and Merchandise imported into and exported from Ireland in lieu of former Duties Drawbacks and Bounties and to further Regulations for securing the Duties of Customs in Ireland.	As declares it to be lawful for Importing Merchants in Ports in Ireland where Tobacco may be imported to give Certificates for all such Coffee Sugar or Tea as they shall fell to Persons residing within the same Port or Place where they shall have imported the same of the several Parcels or Quantities of such Coffee Sugar or Tea which they shall have fold and that such Certificates shall have the same Force and Effect as Permits.

Section 3 of the act repealed 1 enactment, listed in that section, from the passing of the act.

Citation	Short title	Description	Extent of repeal
49 Geo. 3. c. 116	Customs and Excise (Ireland) Act 1809	An Act made in the Forty ninth Year of His present Majesty's Reign intituled An Act to make further Provision for the Execution of the feveral Act relating to the Revenues Matters and Things under the Management of the Commissioners of Customs Port Duties and of the Commissioners of Inland Excise and Taxes in Ireland.	As enacts that every Excise Office for the receiving of Request Notes for Permits or issuing of Permits shall be kept open from Sunrise to Sunset on every Day of the Year except the Days therein excepted.

== Subsequent developments ==
So much of the act "as relates to Permits, and all and every Provision in any Act or Acts relating to the Excise contained for regulating the general Form and issuing of Permits for the Removal and Conveyance of exciseable Commodities, for which similar Provision is in and by this Act made." was repealed by section 20 of the Excise Permit Act 1832 (2 & 3 Will. 4. c. 16), which came into force on 1 April 1832.

The whole act was repealed by section 1 of, and the schedule to, the Statute Law Revision Act 1874 (37 & 38 Vict. c. 35), which came into force on 16 July 1874.
