= Income Tax Act 1806 =

Act of the Parliament of the United Kingdom

- Act of Parliament
- Parliament of the United Kingdom
- Long title: An Act for granting to His Majesty, during the present War and until the Sixth Day of April next after the Ratification of a Definitive Treaty of Peace, further additional Rates and Duties in Great Britain on the Rates and Duties on Profits arising from Property, Professions, Trades and Offices; and for repealing an Act passed in the Forty fifth Year of His present Majesty, for repealing certain Parts of an Act made in the Forty third Year of His present Majesty, for granting a Contribution on the Profits arising from Property, Professions, Trades and Offices; and to consolidate and render more effectual the Provisions for collecting the said Duties.
- Citation: 46 Geo. 3. c. 65
- Territorial extent: England and Wales; Scotland; (Note: Section 1.)

Dates
- Royal assent: 13 June 1806
- Commencement: 5 April 1806 (Note: Section 227.)
- Expired: 6 April 1816 (Note: Section 227 provided that the act, and the duties granted by it, should continue in force "during the present War, and until the Sixth Day of April next after the Ratification of a Definitive Treaty of Peace, and no longer". The Treaty of Paris (1815), the definitive peace treaty ending the Napoleonic Wars, was signed on 20 November 1815.)
- Repealed: 6 August 1872
Other legislation
Repeals/revokes	Income Tax (No. 2) Act 1805
Repealed by	Statute Law Revision Act 1872

Status: Repealed

Text of statute as originally enacted

The Income Tax Act 1806 (46 Geo. 3. c. 65) was an act of the Parliament of the United Kingdom that granted additional wartime rates of income tax on profits arising from property, professions, trades and offices in Great Britain, raising the maximum rate of the tax to ten per cent, and consolidated the provisions for collecting it.

== Provisions ==
Section 2 of the act repealed the whole of the Income Tax (No. 2) Act 1805 (45 Geo. 3. c. 49), except the deductions, exemptions and abatements which might be claimed from any assessment of the duties made for a year before the commencement of this act, and except the penalties and forfeitures contained in that act, and the provisions for their recovery..

== Subsequent developments ==
Section 227 of the act provided that it, and the duties it granted, should continue in force only during the war then being fought against France and until the sixth day of April next after the ratification of a definitive treaty of peace. Following the ratification of the Treaty of Paris (1815) in November 1815, the House of Commons rejected the government's proposal to continue the income tax beyond the coming expiry of the wartime acts, voting against renewal on 18 March 1816 after a large petitioning campaign; the tax accordingly lapsed at the end of the tax year on 5 April 1816.

The whole act was repealed by section 1 of, and the schedule to, the Statute Law Revision Act 1872 (35 & 36 Vict. c. 63), which came into force on 6 August 1872.
