= Income Tax (No. 2) Act 1805 =

Act of the Parliament of the United Kingdom

- Act of Parliament
- Parliament of the United Kingdom
- Long title: An Act to repeal certain parts of an Act, made in the forty-third year of His present Majesty, for granting a contribution on the profits arising from property, professions, trades, and offices; and to consolidate, and render more effectual, the provisions for collecting the said duties.
- Citation: 45 Geo. 3. c. 49
- Territorial extent: United Kingdom

Dates
- Royal assent: 5 June 1805
- Commencement: 5 April 1805 (Note: Section 233.)
- Repealed: 5 April 1806

Other legislation
- Amends: Income Tax Act 1803
- Repealed by: Income Tax Act 1806

Status: Repealed

Text of statute as originally enacted

The Income Tax (No. 2) Act 1805 (45 Geo. 3. c. 49) was an act of the Parliament of the United Kingdom that consolidated and tightened the machinery for collecting the property and income duties first granted by the Income Tax Act 1803 (43 Geo. 3. c. 122), while leaving the rates charged under that act's schedules substantially unchanged.

== Provisions ==
Section 1 of the act repealed so much of the Income Tax Act 1803 (43 Geo. 3. c. 122) as relates to the "he powers, provisions, rules, regulations, clauses, matters and things contained in the act for raising, levying and paying the duties thereby granted, as respects assessments for any year commencing after 5 April 1805, except as to the recovery of arrears of duty assessed under the act and remaining unpaid or unaccounted for on that date".

== Subsequent developments ==
The whole act was repealed by section 2 of the Income Tax Act 1806 (46 Geo. 3. c. 65), which came into force on 5 April 1806, save as to deductions, exemptions and abatements claimed under it before that date, and its penalties and forfeitures and the provisions for their recovery. The 1806 act, in turn, replaced the duties charged under the 1803 and 1805 acts with a new tax on income assessed and collected at source under the same five schedules, a structure that remained the basis of United Kingdom income tax until its temporary abolition in 1816 and reintroduction in 1842.
