= Assessed Taxes Act 1805 =

Act of the Parliament of the United Kingdom

- Act of Parliament
- Parliament of the United Kingdom
- Long title: An Act for granting to His Majesty additional Duties in Great Britain on Horses used in riding, or for drawing certain Carriages; and for consolidating the said additional Duties with the present Duties thereon.
- Citation: 45 Geo. 3. c. 13
- Territorial extent: England and Wales; Scotland; (Note: Section 1.)

Dates
- Royal assent: 18 March 1805
- Commencement: 18 March 1805 (Note: The Acts of Parliament (Commencement) Act 1793.)
- Repealed: 10 August 1872
Other legislation
| Repealed by | Statute Law Revision Act 1872 |
| Relates to | Taxes Act 1803 |

Status: Repealed

Text of statute as originally enacted

The Assessed Taxes Act 1805 (45 Geo. 3. c. 13) was an act of the Parliament of the United Kingdom that granted additional duties in Great Britain on horses used for riding or for drawing carriages, and consolidated those additional duties with the duties already charged on such horses.

== Subsequent developments ==
The whole act was repealed by section 1 of, and the schedule to, the Statute Law Revision Act 1872 (35 & 36 Vict. c. 63), which came into force on 10 August 1872.
