= Taxes Management Act 1880 =

Act of the Parliament of the United Kingdom

Taxes Management Act 1880 (Note: Section 1.)
- Act of Parliament
- Parliament of the United Kingdom
- Long title: An Act to consolidate Enactments relating to certain Taxes and Duties under the management of the Board of Inland Revenue.
- Citation: 43 & 44 Vict. c. 19
- Introduced by: Lord Frederick Cavendish MP (Commons)
- Territorial extent: United Kingdom (Note: Section 2.)

Dates
- Royal assent: 6 August 1880
- Commencement: 1 January 1881 (Note: Section 3.)
- Repealed: 1 October 1963
Other legislation
Amends	See § Repealed enactments
Repeals/revokes	See § Repealed enactments
Amended by	Public Authorities Protection Act 1893; Perjury Act 1911; Income Tax Act 1918; Administration of Justice (Miscellaneous Provisions) Act 1933; Statute Law Revision Act 1950
Repealed by	Finance Act 1963

Status: Repealed

History of passage through Parliament

Records of Parliamentary debate relating to the statute from Hansard

Text of statute as originally enacted

The Taxes Management Act 1880 (43 & 44 Vict. c. 19) was an act of the Parliament of the United Kingdom that consolidated enactments relating to taxation in the United Kingdom.

== Passage ==
Leave to bring in the Taxes Management Bill to the House of Commons was granted to Lord Frederick Cavendish MP and John Holms MP on 22 June 1880. The bill had its first reading in the House of Commons on 22 June 1880, presented by Lord Frederick Cavendish MP. The bill had its second reading in the House of Commons on 28 June 1880 and was committed to a committee of the whole house, which met and reported on 5 July 1880, without amendments. The bill had its third reading in the House of Commons on 7 July 1880 and passed, with amendments.

The amended bill had its first reading in the House of Lords on 8 July 1880. The bill had its second reading in the House of Lords on 15 July 1880 and was committed to a committee of the whole house, which met and reported on 20 July 1880, with amendments. The amended bill had its third reading in the House of Lords on 23 July 1880 and passed, with amendments.

The amended bill was considered and agreed to by the House of Commons on 30 July 1880.

The bill was granted royal assent on 6 August 1880.

== Provisions ==
=== Income tax year ===
Section 48(3) of the act provided a definition of the income tax year for the first time:

Every assessment shall be made for the year commencing and ending on the days herein specified.

(3) As regards income tax—

In Great Britain and Ireland from the sixth day of April to the following fifth day of April inclusive.

=== Repealed enactments ===
Section 4 of the act repealed 44 enactments, listed in the third schedule to the act. Section 4 of the act also provided that the repeals would not affect anything done, any protections, rights, privileges, duties, liabilities, fines, forfeitures, punishments, legal proceedings or bonds and securities issued under the repealed acts.

Citation	Short title	Title	Extent of repeal
43 Geo. 3. c. 99	Taxes Act 1803	An Act for consolidating certain of the provisions contained in any Act or Acts relating to the duties under the management of the Commissioners for the Affairs of Taxes, and for amending the same.	The whole act.
43 Geo. 3. c. 150	Taxes (Scotland) Act 1803	An Act for consolidating certain of the provisions contained in any Act or Acts relating to the duties under the management of the Commissioners for the Affairs of Taxes, as far as the same relate to that part of Great Britain called Scotland.	The whole act.
43 Geo. 3. c. 161	House Tax Act 1803	An Act for repealing the several duties under the management of the Commissioners for the Affairs of Taxes, and granting new duties in lieu thereof; for repealing the duties of excise on licenses on old carriages constructed by coachmakers, and granting new duties thereon, under the management of the said Commissioners for the Affairs of Taxes; and for granting new duties on persons selling carriages by auction or on commission.	Sections sixteen, twenty-four, fifty, fifty-one, fifty-three, sixty-four, fifty-six to fifty-eight inclusive, sixty, sixty-nine, seventy, seventy-six, seventy-eight, and eighty.
45 Geo. 3. c. 71	Taxes Act 1805	An Act to amend the several laws relating to the duties under the management of the Commissioners.	The whole act.
45 Geo. 3. c. 95	Taxes (Scotland) Act 1805	An Act to amend so much of an Act of the forty-third year of the present Majesty, for consolidating certain of the provisions of the Acts relating to the duties in Scotland under the management of the Commissioners for the Affairs of Taxes, as relates to the appointment of assessors and assistants, and to the amounts required to be tendered to persons assessed to the said duties.	The whole act.
48 Geo. 3. c. 55	House Tax Act 1808	An Act for repealing the several duties of assessed taxes, and granting new duties in lieu thereof, and certain additional duties to be consolidated therewith, and also for repealing the duties charged on game certificates, and charging new duties in lieu thereof, to be placed under the management of the Commissioners for the Affairs of Taxes.	Section seven.
48 Geo. 3. c. 141	Assessment of Taxes Act 1808	An Act to amend the Acts relating to the duties of assessed taxes, and of the tax upon the profits of property, professions, trades, and offices, and to regulate the assessment and collection of the same.	Section one, No. 1 Rules to No. 5 Rules inclusive, sections four, five, six, and thirteen.
50 Geo. 3. c. 105	Taxes Act 1810	An Act to regulate the manner of making the assessments of the duties of assessed taxes, and of the tax upon the profits arising from property, professions, trades, and offices, and for granting relief in certain cases relating to the said duties respectively.	The whole act.
52 Geo. 3. c. 95	Taxes (Scotland) Act 1812	An Act to amend and facilitate the assessment and collection of the assessed taxes, and of the rates and duties on profits arising from property, professions, trades, and offices in that part of Great Britain called Scotland.	The whole act.
55 Geo. 3. c. 161	Taxes (Scotland) Act 1815	An Act to amend and render more effectual an Act of the fifty-second year of the present Majesty, to amend and facilitate the assessment and collection of the assessed taxes, and of the rates and duties on profits arising from property, professions, trades, and offices, in that part of Great Britain called Scotland.	The whole act.
1 & 2 Geo. 4. c. 113	Taxes Act 1821	An Act to continue several Acts for the relief of persons compounding for assessed taxes from an annual assessment, for a limited term; and to amend the Acts relating to assessments and compositions of assessed taxes.	The whole act.
3 Geo. 4. c. 88	Land and Assessed Taxes Act 1822	An Act to regulate the appointment of receivers general in England and Wales.	The whole act.
6 Geo. 4. c. 7	House Tax Act 1825	An Act for the further repeal of certain duties of assessed taxes, and for granting relief in the cases therein mentioned.	Section eleven.
6 Geo. 4. c. 32	Land Tax Act 1825	An Act to provide for the application of moneys arising in certain cases of assessments for land tax in Great Britain.	The whole act.
1 & 2 Will. 4. c. 18	Receipt and Remittance of Taxes, etc. Act 1831	An Act for transferring the duties of receivers general of the land and assessed taxes to persons exercising the offices of inspectors of taxes, and for making other provisions for the receipt and remittance of the said taxes.	The whole act.
4 & 5 Will. 4. c. 60	Land Tax Act 1834	An Act to amend the laws relating to the land and assessed taxes, and to regulate the breach of stamps and taxes.	Sections one, six, seven, eleven, twelve, thirteen, fourteen, and fifteen.
5 & 6 Will. 4. c. 20	Stamps and Taxes Act 1835	An Act to consolidate certain offices in the collection of the revenues of stamps and taxes, and to amend the laws relating thereto.	Sections six, seven, ten to twenty-one inclusive.
5 & 6 Will. 4. c. 64	Stamp Duties Act 1835	An Act to alter certain duties of stamps and assessed taxes, and to regulate the collection thereof.	Sections nine to twelve inclusive.
6 & 7 Will. 4. c. 65	Game Laws (England) Local Taxes, etc. (Scotland) Act 1836	An Act for granting relief from the duties of assessed taxes, and on stage carriages in certain cases, and to regulate the charging of the duty payable for taking or killing game in Great Britain; and to provide for the collection of certain local taxes in Scotland.	Sections ten to twelve inclusive.
1 Vict. c. 61	Assessed Taxes Act 1837	An Act to extend an exemption granted by an Act of the last session of Parliament from the duties of assessed taxes, in respect of certain carriages with less than four wheels; and to amend the laws relating to the said duties.	Section three.
5 & 6 Vict. c. 37	Land Tax Act 1842	An Act to continue until the fifth day of April one thousand eight hundred and forty-three composition for assessed taxes, and to amend the laws relating to the land and assessed taxes.	Section seven.
6 & 7 Vict. c. 24	Land Tax, Assessed Tax, and Income Tax Act 1843	An Act to continue until the fifth day of April one thousand eight hundred and forty-four composition for assessed taxes, and to amend the laws relating to the duties on profits arising from property, professions, trades, and offices.	The whole act.
7 & 8 Vict. c. 46	Assessed Taxes, Property Tax, and Duty on Pensions and Offices of Profit Act 1844	An Act to continue until the fifth day of April one thousand eight hundred and forty-six composition for assessed taxes, and to amend certain provisions relating to duties under the management of the Commissioners of Stamps and Taxes.	The whole act.
9 & 10 Vict. c. 56	Assessed Taxes and Income Tax Act 1846	An Act to provide for the proceedings under the Acts relating to the duties of assessed taxes, and the duties on profits arising from property, professions, trades, and offices in England.	The whole act.
17 & 18 Vict. c. 1 (Note: Incorrect cited as "17 Vict. c. 1" in the act.)	Assessed Taxes Act 1854	An Act to explain and amend an Act of the last session relating to the duties of assessed taxes, and to authorize justices of the peace in Ireland to act in certain matters relating to Income Tax.	Section one.
17 & 18 Vict. c. 85	Land, Assessed, and Income Taxes Act 1854	An Act for better securing the collecting and accounting for the land tax, assessed taxes, and income tax by the collectors thereof.	The whole act.
19 & 20 Vict. c. 80	Taxes Act 1856	An Act to grant relief with respect to the Inhabited House Duty in Scotland in respect of certain public burdens charged thereon; to alter and regulate the allowances to clerks to the Commissioners of Income Tax; and to amend the laws relating to the land, assessed, and income taxes.	Sections one and four.
20 & 21 Vict. c. 28	Land and Assessed Taxes (Scotland) Act 1857	An Act to amend the laws relating to the payment of the land and assessed taxes and property and income tax in Scotland.	Section two.
24 & 25 Vict. c. 91	Revenue (No. 2) Act 1861	An Act to amend the laws relating to the Inland Revenue.	Sections thirty-seven to forty-five inclusive.
25 & 26 Vict. c. 22 (Note: Incorrectly cited as "25 Vict. c. 22" in the act.)	Revenue Act 1862	An Act to continue certain duties of Customs and Inland Revenue for the service of Her Majesty, and to grant, alter, and repeal certain other duties.	Sections forty-two to forty-five inclusive.
26 & 27 Vict. c. 33	Revenue Act 1863	An Act for granting to Her Majesty certain duties of Inland Revenue, and to amend the laws relating to the Inland Revenue.	Section ten.
27 & 28 Vict. c. 56	Revenue (No. 2) Act 1864	An Act for granting to Her Majesty certain stamp duties, and to amend the laws relating to the Inland Revenue.	Sections fifteen and nineteen.
28 & 29 Vict. c. 30 (Note: Incorrectly cited as "28 Vict. c. 30" in the act.)	Revenue Act 1865	An Act to amend the duties of Customs and Inland Revenue.	Section five.
29 & 30 Vict. c. 64	Inland Revenue Act 1866	An Act to amend the laws relating to the Inland Revenue.	Sections seventeen and eighteen.
30 & 31 Vict. c. 90	Revenue Act 1867	An Act to alter certain duties and to amend the laws relating to the Inland Revenue.	Section twenty-nine.
32 & 33 Vict. c. 14	Revenue Act 1869	An Act to grant certain duties of Customs and Inland Revenue, and to repeal and alter other duties of Customs and Inland Revenue.	Part II., sections five to eleven, inclusive.
33 & 34 Vict. c. 4 (Note: Incorrectly cited as "33 & 34 Vict. c. 4")	Income Tax Assessment Act 1870	Income Tax Assessment Act, 1870.	The whole act.
33 & 34 Vict. c. 32	Customs and Inland Revenue Act 1870	The Customs and Inland Revenue Act, 1870.	Section two.
34 & 35 Vict. c. 103	House Tax Act 1871	The Customs and Inland Revenue Act, 1871.	Section three.
36 & 37 Vict. c. 8 (Note: Incorrectly cited as "36 Vict. c. 8" in the act.)	Income Tax Act 1873	An Act to make provision for the assessment of income tax, and as to assessors in Scotland.	Sections one and two.
36 & 37 Vict. c. 18 (Note: Incorrectly cited as "36 Vict. c. 18" in the act.)	Customs and Inland Revenue Act 1873	The Customs and Inland Revenue Act, 1873.	Sections six to nine inclusive.
37 & 38 Vict. c. 16 (Note: Incorrectly cited as "37 Vict. c. 16" in the act.)	Customs and Inland Revenue Act 1874	The Customs and Inland Revenue Act, 1874.	Sections eight to ten inclusive.
41 & 42 Vict. c. 15 (Note: Incorrectly cited as "41 Vict. c. 15" in the act.)	Customs and Inland Revenue Act 1878	The Customs and Inland Revenue Act, 1878.	Sections fourteen and fifteen.
42 & 43 Vict. c. 21	Customs and Inland Revenue Act 1879	The Customs and Inland Revenue Act, 1879.	Sections nineteen to twenty-five inclusive.

== Subsequent developments ==
The act was described as a consolidation act.

Section 20 of the act to "every such action or suit." was repealed by section 2 of, and the schedule to, the Public Authorities Protection Act 1893 (56 & 57 Vict. c. 61), which came into force on 1 January 1894.

The whole act as far as it related to income taxes was repealed by section 238 of, and the seventh schedule to, the Income Tax Act 1918 (8 & 9 Geo. 5. c. 40), which came into force on 6 April 1919.

Section 53 of the act was repealed by section 1(1) of, and the first schedule to, the Statute Law Revision Act 1950 (14 Geo. 6. c. 6), which came into force on 23 May 1950.

The whole act was repealed by section 72(8) of, and part VI of schedule 14 to, the Finance Act 1963, which came into force on 1 October 1963.
