= Taxes (Scotland) Act 1803 =

Act of the Parliament of the United Kingdom

- Act of Parliament
- Parliament of the United Kingdom
- Long title: An Act for consolidating certain of the Provisions contained in any Act or Acts, relating to the Duties under the Management of the Commissioners for the Affairs of Taxes; and for amending the said Acts, so far as the same relate to that Part of Great Britain called Scotland.
- Citation: 43 Geo. 3. c. 150
- Territorial extent: Scotland (Note: Section 1.)

Dates
- Royal assent: 11 August 1803
- Commencement: 24 May 1804 (Note: Section 2.)
- Repealed: 1 January 1881

Other legislation
- Repealed by: Taxes Management Act 1880
- Relates to: Taxes Act 1803

Status: Repealed

Text of statute as originally enacted

The Taxes (Scotland) Act 1803 (43 Geo. 3. c. 150) was an act of the Parliament of the United Kingdom that consolidated and amended enactments relating to the assessed taxes and other duties under the management of the Commissioners for the Affairs of Taxes, so far as they related to Scotland.

The Taxes Act 1803 (43 Geo. 3. c. 99) made equivalent provisions for England and Wales.

== Subsequent developments ==
The whole act was repealed by section 4(1) of, and the third schedule to, the Taxes Management Act 1880 (43 & 44 Vict. c. 19), which came into force on 1 January 1881.
