= Taxes Act 1803 =

Act of the Parliament of the United Kingdom

- Act of Parliament
- Parliament of the United Kingdom
- Long title: An Act for consolidating certain of the Provisions contained in any Act or Acts relating to the Duties under the Management of the Commissioners for the Affairs of Taxes, and for amending the same.
- Citation: 43 Geo. 3. c. 99
- Territorial extent: England and Wales (Note: Section 1, which extended the duties transferred by the act "so far as the same relate to England, Wales, and Berwick-upon-Tweed".)

Dates
- Royal assent: 27 July 1803
- Commencement: 5 April 1804 (Note: Section 2.)
- Repealed: 1 January 1881

Other legislation
- Repealed by: Taxes Management Act 1880
- Relates to: Taxes (Scotland) Act 1803

Status: Repealed

Text of statute as originally enacted

The Taxes Act 1803 (43 Geo. 3. c. 99) was an act of the Parliament of the United Kingdom that consolidated enactments relating to the assessed taxes — the duties on windows and lights, inhabited houses, servants, carriages, horses, mules, and dogs — under the management of the Commissioners for the Affairs of Taxes in England and Wales.

The Taxes (Scotland) Act 1803 (43 Geo. 3. c. 150) made equivalent provisions for Scotland.

== Subsequent developments ==
The whole act was repealed by section 4(1) of, and the third schedule to, the Taxes Management Act 1880 (43 & 44 Vict. c. 19), which came into force on 1 January 1881.
