= Houses of Parliament Act 1837 =

Act of the Parliament of the United Kingdom

- Act of Parliament
- Parliament of the United Kingdom
- Long title: An Act to enable the Commissioners of Her Majesty's Woods, Forests, Land Revenues, Works, and Buildings to purchase Ground and Tenements required to complete the Site for the new Houses of Parliament.
- Citation: 1 & 2 Vict. c. 7
- Territorial extent: United Kingdom

Dates
- Royal assent: 23 December 1837
- Commencement: 23 December 1837 (Note: The Acts of Parliament (Commencement) Act 1793.)
Other legislation
| Relates to | Houses of Parliament Act 1806 |

Status: Current legislation

Text of statute as originally enacted

The Houses of Parliament Act 1837 (1 & 2 Vict. c. 7) is an act of the Parliament of the United Kingdom, signed into law on 23 December 1837. It made a number of miscellaneous provisions to give the Commissioners of Woods, Forests, Land Revenues, Works and Buildings power to purchase land and buildings necessary to prepare the site for the reconstruction of the Palace of Westminster.
