= Houses of Parliament Act 1806 =

Act of the Parliament of the United Kingdom

- Act of Parliament
- Parliament of the United Kingdom
- Long title: An Act for consolidating and rendering more effectual the several Acts for the Purchase of Buildings and further Improvement of the Streets and Places near to Westminster Hall, and the Two Houses of Parliament.
- Citation: 46 Geo. 3. c. 89
- Territorial extent: United Kingdom

Dates
- Royal assent: 16 July 1806
- Commencement: 16 July 1806 (Note: The Acts of Parliament (Commencement) Act 1793.)
Other legislation
Amended by	Houses of Parliament Act 1810; Houses of Parliament Act 1826
Relates to	Houses of Parliament Act 1837

Status: Partially repealed

Text of statute as originally enacted

The Houses of Parliament Act 1806 (46 Geo. 3. c. 89) is an act of the Parliament of the United Kingdom that consolidated earlier enactments for the purchase of buildings and further improvement of the streets and places near Westminster Hall and the two Houses of Parliament in Westminster.

== Subsequent developments ==
The act was amended by the Houses of Parliament Act 1826 (7 Geo. 4. c. 78), which came into force on 31 May 1826.

The Houses of Parliament Act 1837 (1 & 2 Vict. c. 7) later gave the Commissioners of Woods, Forests, Land Revenues, Works and Buildings separate powers to purchase ground and buildings needed to complete the site for the rebuilding of the Palace of Westminster following the fire of 1834.
