= James B. Hume =

American lawman (1827-1904)

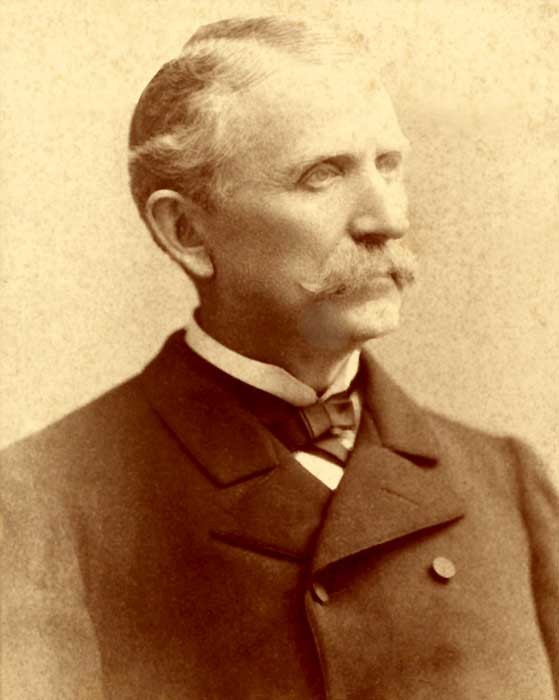
- Born: January 23, 1827; Stamford Township, Delaware County, New York. U.S.
- Died: May 17, 1904 (aged 77); Berkeley, California, U.S.

James B. Hume (January 23, 1827–May 18, 1904) was one of the American West's premier lawmen.

Born in Stamford Township, Delaware County, New York, he left home in 1850 headed for the gold fields of California with his brother John. Hume panned gold and mined for a number of years in addition to operating a trade store off and on. In 1860 he began his career as a peace officer serving as a deputy tax collector for El Dorado County, California. In 1864 he was elected City Marshal of Placerville, California, and in 1864 hired as Undersheriff of El Dorado County. He ran for Sheriff in 1865 and remained in office until 1870. In 1871 Wells, Fargo & Company hired him as a detective, but gave him a year's leave in 1872 to serve as deputy warden of the Nevada State Prison. He became one of the most prominent detectives of the times. He married Lida Munson on April 28, 1884, and had a son, Samuel James Hume. He never retired from the company, but after an illness in 1897 he slowed down and began working fewer road trips. He died at his home in Berkeley, California.

== Black Bart ==
One of Hume's most famous cases was that of Black Bart. Black Bart may have been a cunning and intelligent stage coach robber, but detective Hume was an equally skilled lawman who eventually brought Bart to justice. James B. Hume had an impressive record as a California and Nevada lawman before he joined the Wells Fargo freight company in 1873. In both appearances and actions he had all the characteristics of a model western lawman: tall, handsome, modest, reticent, quietly efficient, and resourceful in his use of modern detection methods, including the science of ballistics.

Hume had been trailing Black Bart almost from the beginning of the thief’s career. He visited the sites of all the robberies and patiently put together a valuable list of information. Witnesses in settlements near the scenes of the robberies described seeing a polite, friendly man in his fifties, about five foot eight or ten in height with brownish gray hair, a fierce gray mustache and matching goatee, carrying a bedroll (which Hume correctly inferred carried his duster, sack disguise, shotgun and loot), passing through on foot and quickly disappearing. Hume made special note of the reports by several witnesses that the man’s boots were neatly slit at the toes as if to relieve corns – small wonder, given the territory Bart covered on foot (he was reportedly afraid of horses and never traveled by horseback). Hume was well aware that this figure the locals had reported was likely to be the culprit.

Hume’s major break occurred on November 3, 1883, when Bart robbed a Wells Fargo coach headed from the town of Sonora to Milton, in Calaveras County. One of the drivers fired a shot at Bart, and forced him to promptly flee. Within the nearby brush, local officers found a cache of rations and correctly assumed that the goods were the bandit's. More importantly however, a blood-stained handkerchief bearing the laundry mark "F.X.0.7" was recovered. Hume engaged with special detective Harry Morse, former sheriff of Alameda County, spending a week visiting every laundry in San Francisco – nearly a hundred of them, to track down where the mark originated from. Eventually Morse found the origin of the mark at a laundry on Bush Street in San Francisco. The proprietor identified the F.X.0.7 handkerchief mark as that assigned to C.E. Bolton, a man who lived in a hotel on Second Street.

The arrest of Black Bart was at hand. Morse got Bart to accompany him to Hume's office in the nearby Wells Fargo building, and after a thorough grilling, Bart eventually confessed and received a term in San Quentin prison.

Hume and Morse were real detectives of the time, outside of the Pinkerton Agency and Wells Fargo Operations, traditional law work consisted primarily of forming posses, serving warrants with a gun, and preventing mobs from lynching the miscreants.

Few lawmen in 1883 put their noses to the carpet searching for clues in the manner of Sherlock Holmes (Holmes had not yet surfaced – his first adventure was published in 1887), not many of the old west, did the legal legwork of Hume ending Black Bart’s escapades.

== Other family ==
Hume's sister Mary married Mathew McClaughry in Kortwright, New York. Their oldest son Robert W. McClaughry served as a major in the 118th Illinois Infantry during the American Civil War. R.W. McClaughry would later serve as the Chicago Chief of Police, Warden of Joliet Prison and was the second warden of the United States Penitentiary at Leavenworth, KS.

== Popular culture ==
In "The Bandits of Panamint," the fifteenth episode of the first season of the syndicated television series Death Valley Days, George Sherwood plays "Detective Hume" in a dramatization of Hume's pursuit of some stage robbers who, while on the run, have discovered a rich silver mine and devise a way to figure out how to register their claim without going to jail.

In "Black Bart," the sixteenth episode of the first season of Stories of the Century, the show's protagonist, Railroad Detective Matt Clark (Jim Davis) portrays the role that Hume played in real life.

In "Black Bart," the fourth episode from the third season of Death Valley Days, the battle of wits between Hume, played by John Damler, and a wily stage robber is dramatized.

"Temporary Warden," the first episode of the fourteenth season of Death Valley Days, dramatizes an incident from the career of Hume, played by Ronald Reagan, in which, after accepting a temporary appointment as warden of the Nevada State Prison in Carson City, he tracks down a trio of escaped convicts who had been terrorizing the state.

== Sources ==
- Dillon, Richard. Wells, Fargo Detective: The Biography of James B. Hume. New York: Coward–McCann, Inc., 1969.
- John Boessenecker. Shotguns and Stagecoaches: The Brave Men Who Rode for Wells Fargo in the Wild West. New York: St. Martin's Press (2018).
