= Black Bart (outlaw) =

American outlaw (c.1829–1888)

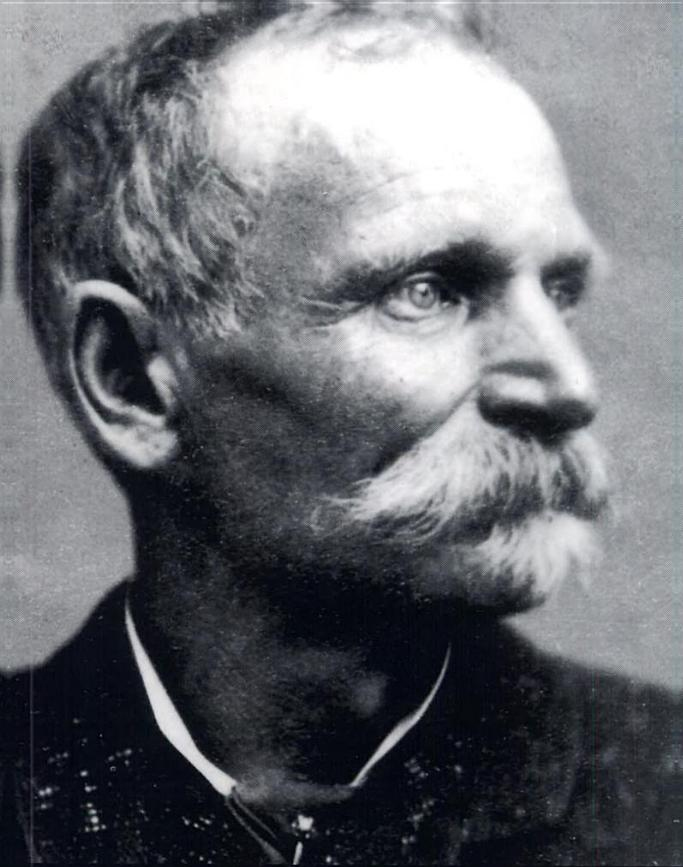
- Charles Boles aka "Black Bart"
- Born: Charles E. Boles c. 1829; Norfolk, England
- Died: after February 28, 1888 (aged 58–59)
- Other names: Charles E. Boles, Charles Bolton, C.E. Bolton
- Occupations: stagecoach robber, prospector, soldier
- Spouse: Mary Elizabeth Johnson
- Children: 4
- Status: Time served
- Conviction: Robbery
- Penalty: 6 years

Charles E. Boles (c. 1829 – after February 28, 1888), also known as Black Bart, was an English-born American outlaw noted for the poetic messages he left behind after two of his robberies. Often called Charley by his friends, he was also known as Charles (or C. E.) Bolton. Considered a gentleman bandit with a reputation for style and sophistication, he was one of the most notorious stagecoach robbers to operate in and around Northern California and Southern Oregon during the 1870s and 1880s.

== Early life ==
Charles Boles was born around 1829 in Norfolk, England to John and Maria Boles (sometimes spelled Bolles). He was the third of ten children, having six brothers and three sisters. When he was two years old, his parents immigrated to Jefferson County, New York, where his father purchased a farm four miles (6.4 km) north of Plessis Village in the direction of Alexandria Bay.

=== California Gold Rush ===
In late 1849, Boles and his brothers David and James joined in the California Gold Rush, prospecting in the North Fork of the American River near Sacramento. They traveled back to New York in 1852, but Boles later returned with his brothers David and Robert. Both brothers fell ill shortly after their arrival and died. Charles Boles remained in California for another two years before giving up and returning East again.

In 1854, Boles (who now used this spelling) married Mary Elizabeth Johnson. By 1860, they were living with their four children in Decatur, Illinois.

=== Civil War ===
On August 13, 1862, Boles enlisted as a private in Company B, 116th Illinois Regiment (his name is spelled "Boles" in the company records). He became a First sergeant within a year. Boles was seriously wounded at the Battle of Vicksburg, and took part in Sherman's March to the Sea. He received brevet commissions as both second lieutenant and first lieutenant, and on June 7, 1865, was discharged with his regiment in Washington, D.C. He returned home at last to his family in Illinois.

=== Prospecting Again ===
In 1867, Boles went prospecting for gold in Idaho and Montana. In a surviving letter to his wife from August 1871, he told her of an unpleasant encounter with some Wells, Fargo & Company agents and vowed to exact revenge.

== Criminal career ==
Boles adopted the nickname "Black Bart" and proceeded to rob Wells Fargo stagecoaches at least 28 times across northern California between 1875 and 1883, including a number of times along the historic Siskiyou Trail between California and Oregon. Although Boles became widely known for the poetic messages left behind after his robberies, he wrote only two poems–left at the fourth and fifth robbery sites–but this was enough to ensure his fame. Black Bart was quite successful as a highwayman, often taking in thousands of dollars a year.

Boles was afraid of horses and he fled from all of his robberies on foot. He was invariably polite, never using foul language except in his poems. He dressed in a long linen duster coat and a bowler hat, using a flour sack with holes cut for his eyes as a mask. He brandished a shotgun but reportedly never once fired it during his years as an outlaw. All these became his trademarks and he quickly gained notoriety.

=== First robbery ===
On July 26, 1875, Boles robbed his first stagecoach in Calaveras County, California, on the road between Copperopolis and Milton. He spoke with a deep and resonant tone as he politely ordered stage driver John Shine to "throw down the box". As Shine handed over the strongbox, Boles shouted, "If he dares to shoot, give him a solid volley, boys". Seeing rifle barrels pointed at him from the nearby bushes, Shine quickly handed over the strongbox. Shine waited until Boles vanished and then went to recover the empty strongbox, but upon examining the area, he discovered that the "men with rifles" were actually carefully rigged sticks. Black Bart's first robbery netted him $160 (approximately $5200 in 2024 US dollars, adjusted for inflation).

=== Final stagecoach robbery ===
Boles committed his last holdup on November 3, 1883, at the site of his first robbery on Funk Hill, southeast of the present town of Copperopolis. Boles wore a flour-sack mask with two eye holes. Driven by Reason McConnell, the stage had crossed the Reynolds Ferry on the old road from Sonora to Milton. The driver stopped at the ferry to pick up Jimmy Rolleri, the 19-year-old son of the ferry owner. Rolleri had his rifle with him and got off at the bottom of the hill to hunt along the creek and meet the stage on the other side. When he arrived at the western end, he found that the stage was not there and began walking up the stage road. Near the summit, he saw the stage driver and his team of horses.

McConnell told him that as the stage had approached the summit, Boles had stepped out from behind a rock with a shotgun in his hands. He forced McConnell to unhitch the team and take them over the crest of the hill. Boles then attempted to remove the strongbox but it had been bolted to the floor of the coach and took some time to remove. Rolleri and McConnell went over the crest and saw Boles exiting the stage with the strong box. McConnell grabbed Rolleri's rifle and fired at Boles twice, but missed; Rolleri took the rifle and fired as Boles ran into a thicket, then stumbled as if he had been hit. Rolleri and McConnell followed Boles into the thicket and they found a small, blood-stained bundle of mail he had dropped. Boles had been wounded in the hand. After running a quarter of a mile, he stopped and wrapped his hand in a handkerchief to control the bleeding. He found a rotten log and stuffed the sack with the gold amalgam into it, keeping $500 in gold coins. Boles hid the shotgun in a hollow tree, threw everything else away, and fled. In a manuscript written by stage driver McConnell about 20 years after the robbery, he claimed he fired all four shots at Boles. The first missed, but he thought the second or third shot hit Boles, and was certain that the fourth shot did. Boles had only the single wound to his hand.

==== Investigation and arrest ====
When Boles was wounded and forced to flee, he left behind several personal items. These included his eyeglasses, some food, and a handkerchief with a laundry mark F.X.O.7. Detective James B. Hume of Wells Fargo found these at the scene. Hume and detective Harry N. Morse visited every laundry in San Francisco, inquiring about the laundry mark. After contacting around 90 laundries, the handkerchief was traced to Ferguson & Bigg's California Laundry on Bush Street and discovered that the handkerchief belonged to a man who lived in a modest boarding house.

The detectives learned that Boles claimed to be a mining engineer and made frequent "business trips" that coincided with the Wells Fargo robberies. After initially denying that he was Black Bart, Boles eventually admitted that he had robbed several Wells Fargo stages, though he confessed only to crimes committed before 1879. Boles apparently believed the statute of limitations had expired on those robberies. When booked, he gave his name as T. Z. Spalding, but police found a Bible, a gift from his wife, inscribed with his real name.

The police report said that Boles was "a person of great endurance. Exhibited genuine wit under most trying circumstances, and was extremely proper and polite in behavior. Eschews profanity."

==== Conviction and imprisonment ====
Wells Fargo pressed charges only on the final robbery. Boles was convicted in 1884 and sentenced to six years in San Quentin Prison, but he was released in January 1888, on good behavior. His health had deteriorated during his time in prison; he had visibly aged, his eyesight was failing, and he had gone deaf in one ear. Upon his release, he was swarmed by reporters and asked if he had plans to rob any more stagecoaches. "No, gentlemen," he replied, smiling. "I'm through with crime." Asked if he would write more poems, he laughed and said, "Did you not hear me say that I was through with crime?"

== Final days ==
Boles never returned to his wife after his release from prison, although he did write letters to her. In one of them he wrote that he was tired of being shadowed by Wells Fargo, felt demoralized, and wanted to get away from everybody. The last known sighting of Boles was on February 28, 1888. Hume said Wells Fargo tracked him to Visalia, California. The owner of the Visalia House Hotel said a man who answered the description of Bowles had checked in and then was never seen again.

=== Copycat robber ===
On November 14, 1888, another Wells Fargo stage was robbed by a masked highwayman. The lone bandit left a verse that read:

So here I've stood while wind and rain
Have set the trees a-sobbin,
And risked my life for that box,
That wasn't worth the robbin.

Detective Hume was called to examine the note. After comparing it with the handwriting of genuine Black Bart poetry, he declared the new holdup was the work of a copycat criminal.

=== Rumors and theories ===
Victoria Tudor, the Marysville Cemetery Commissioner, has said Boles had lived in Marysville, California in later life, working as a pharmacist. Boles is rumored to have been buried in an unmarked grave in the Knights Landing Cemetery in Knights Landing, California. Johnny Thacker, a Wells Fargo detective who had participated in Boles's arrest, said in 1897 that he believed Boles had gone to live in Japan.

== Verses ==
Boles, like many of his contemporaries, read dime novel–style serial adventure stories which appeared in local newspapers. In the early 1870s, the Sacramento Union ran a story called The Case of Summerfield by Caxton (a pseudonym of William Henry Rhodes). In the story, the villain dressed in black and had long unruly black hair, a large black beard, and wild grey eyes. The villain, named Black Bart, robbed Wells Fargo stagecoaches and brought great fear to those who were unlucky enough to cross him. Boles may have read the Sacramento Union story. He told a Wells Fargo detective that the name popped into his head when he was writing the first poem, and he used it.

Although Boles received much notoriety for his poetic verses, he left only two that have been authenticated. The first was at the scene of the August 3, 1877, holdup of a stage traveling from Point Arena to Duncans Mills, California:

I've labored long and hard for bread,
For honor, and for riches,
But on my corns too long you've tread,
You fine-haired sons of bitches.

— Black Bart, 1877

The second verse was left at the site of his July 25, 1878, holdup of a stage traveling from Quincy to Oroville, California:

Here I lay me down to sleep
To wait the coming morrow,
Perhaps success, perhaps defeat,
And everlasting sorrow.
Let come what will, I'll try it on,
My condition can't be worse;
And if there's money in that box
'Tis munny in my purse.

— Black Bart

== List of crimes ==
=== 1870s ===
- July 26, 1875: The stage from Sonora, Tuolumne County to Milton, Calaveras County was robbed by a man wearing a flour sack over his head with two holes cut out for the eyes.
- December 28, 1875: The stage from North San Juan, Nevada County to Marysville, Yuba County. A newspaper related that it was held up by four men. This too had a description of the lone robber and his "trademarks". The "three other men" were in the hills around the stage; the driver saw their "rifles". When the investigators arrived at the scene they found the "rifles" used in the heist were nothing more than sticks wedged in the brush.
- August 3, 1877: The stage from Point Arena, Mendocino County to Duncans Mills, Sonoma County.
- July 25, 1878: A stage traveling from Quincy, Plumas County to Oroville, Butte County.
- October 2, 1878: In Mendocino County, near Ukiah, Bart was seen picnicking along the roadside before the robbery.
- October 3, 1878: In Mendocino County, the stage from Covelo to Ukiah was robbed. Bart walked to the McCreary farm and paid for dinner. Fourteen-year-old Donna McCreary provided the first detailed description of Bart: "Graying brown hair, missing two of his front teeth, deep-set piercing blue eyes under heavy eyebrows. Slender hands and intellectual in conversation, well-flavored with polite jokes."
- June 21, 1879: The stage from La Porte, Plumas County to Oroville, Butte County. Bart said to the driver, "Sure hope you have a lot of gold in that strongbox, I'm nearly out of money." In fact, the stage held no Wells Fargo gold or cash.
- October 25, 1879: An interstate route was robbed when Bart held up the stage from Roseburg, Douglas County, Oregon, to Redding, Shasta County, California, stealing U.S. mail pouches on a Saturday night.
- October 27, 1879: Another California robbery, the stage from Alturas, Modoc County, to Redding, Shasta County. Jim Hume was sure that Bart was the one-eyed ex-Ohioan, Frank Fox.

=== 1880s ===
- July 22, 1880: In Sonoma County, the stage from Point Arena to Duncans Mills (same location as on August 3, 1877; Wells Fargo added it to the list when he was captured).
- September 1, 1880: In Shasta County, the stage from Weaverville to Redding. Near French Gulch, Bart said, "Hurry up the hounds; it gets lonesome in the mountains."
- September 16, 1880: In Jackson County, Oregon, the stage from Roseburg, Oregon to Yreka, California. This is the farthest north Bart is known to have traveled.
- September 23, 1880: In Jackson County, Oregon, the stage from Yreka to Roseburg (US President Rutherford B. Hayes and General William T. Sherman traveled on this same stage three days later). On October 1, a person (Frank Fox?) who closely matched the description of Bart was arrested at Elk Creek Station and later released.
- November 20, 1880: In Siskiyou County, the stage from Redding to Roseburg. This robbery failed because of the noise of an approaching stage or because of a hatchet in the driver's hand.
- August 31, 1881: In Siskiyou County, the stage from Roseburg to Yreka. Mail sacks were cut in a "T" shape, another Bart trademark.
- October 8, 1881: In Shasta County, the stage from Yreka to Redding. Stage driver Horace Williams asked Bart, "How much did you make?" Bart answered, "Not very much for the chances I take."
- October 11, 1881: In Shasta County, the stage from Lakeview to Redding. Hume kept losing Bart's trail.
- December 15, 1881: In Yuba County, near Marysville. Bart took mail bags and evaded capture due to his swiftness afoot.
- December 27, 1881: In Nevada County, the stage from North San Juan to Smartsville. Nothing much was taken, but Bart was wrongly blamed for another stage robbery in Smartsville.
- January 26, 1882: In Mendocino County, the stage from Ukiah to Cloverdale. Again the posse was on his tracks within the hour and again they lost him after Kelseyville.
- June 14, 1882: In Mendocino County, the stage from Little Lake to Ukiah. Hiram Willits, Postmaster of Willitsville (present-day Willits, California), was on the stage.
- July 13, 1882: In Plumas County, the stage from La Porte to Oroville. This stage was loaded with gold and George Hackett was armed. Bart lost his derby as he fled the scene when it was determined that the Wells Fargo agent in LaPorte had supplied hardware to bolt down the strongbox. His derby was traced to him eventually through the laundry mark. The same stage was again held-up in Forbestown and Hackett blasted the would-be robber into the bushes. This was mistakenly blamed on Bart.
- September 17, 1882: In Shasta County, the stage from Yreka to Redding; a repeat of October 8, 1881 (same stage, place and driver), but Bart got only a few dollars.
- November 24, 1882: In Sonoma County, the stage from Lakeport to Cloverdale; "The longest 30 miles in the World."
- April 12, 1883: In Sonoma County, the stage from Lakeport to Cloverdale; another repeat of the last robbery.
- June 23, 1883: In Amador County, the stage from Jackson to Ione.
- November 3, 1883: In Calaveras County, the stage from Sonora to Milton.

== Bestowal ==
=== In geography ===
In some areas where Black Bart operated, notably Redwood Valley, California, there is a traditional annual Black Bart Parade featuring a man dressed as Black Bart playing him as a stereotypical Old West villain. Also in Redwood Valley, California, the road leading from California State Route 20 to Hell's Delight Canyon is called Black Bart Trail. There is a large rock at the side of Highway 101 on the Ridgewood Summit between Redwood Valley and Willits known by locals as "Black Bart Rock", though it is not the actual rock behind which Black Bart was reputed to have hidden while robbing stagecoaches (that rock having been lost in a series of highway improvements over the years). In Duncans Mills, California, there is a plaque commemorating Black Bart and featuring his first poem. In Oroville, there is a road named Black Bart Road, as well as a stone mortar monument with a description of a robbery that took place at the scene. In South Lake Tahoe, California there is a Black Bart Avenue off of Pioneer Trail commemorating his poems. In San Andreas, CA, there is an inn named for him: the Black Bart Inn. A pumpkin farm in Warrensburg, Illinois (near his Decatur residence) is named Black Bart's Pumpkin Patch.

=== In literature ===
Black Bart's life and exploits and his pursuit and capture by Hume and Morse are the subject of the 2017 novel The Ballad of Black Bart by Loren D. Estleman. The book was named Best Fiction in its "True West Best of the West 2018 Western Books" by True West Magazine.

The first full length biography is Gentleman Bandit: The True Story of Black Bart, the Old West's Most Infamous Stagecoach Robber, written by John Boessenecker and published by Hanover Square Press in 2023.

=== In comics ===
Black Bart is a character in La Diligence (The Stagecoach), by Morris and Goscinny, a Lucky Luke comic book from 1968.

=== In film and television ===
Dan Duryea starred as Black Bart (1948), a film produced by Universal Pictures.

In 1954, Arthur Space played Black Bart in the eponymous episode of Jim Davis's syndicated western television series, Stories of the Century.

In Gunsmoke episodes, a Black Bart wanted poster can be seen posted in Matt Dillon's office.

Black Bart appears as a character in Bob Clark's 1983 film, A Christmas Story, though he is only a figment of Ralphie Parker's imagination.

The South Park episode "Casa Bonita" includes an area known as "Black Bart's Cave".

In the 1917 film A Romance of the Redwoods, the leading male character is a highwayman named "Black" Brown. The movie largely parallels Black Bart's life, such as the Northern California setting, the rigging sticks on rocks to give the impression that a group of armed men are aiming at a stagecoach, and the character of Brown being shot in the hand.

The 1954 Death Valley Days episode "Black Bart" (Season 3, Episode 4) has Don Beddoe playing the title character.

A working title of the 1974 Western comedy film Blazing Saddles was Black Bart, a pun in reference to both this historical Bart and the film's main character being an African American named Bart.

=== In music ===
He inspired the Blue Lotus album Across The Canyon.

The song "Black Bart" is the 10th track on the 2013 album Outlaw Gentlemen & Shady Ladies of heavy metal band Volbeat.

== See also ==
- List of people who disappeared mysteriously (pre-1910)

== Bibliography ==
- Boessenecker, John (1998). Lawman: The Life and Times of Harry Morse, 1835–1912. University of Oklahoma Press. p. 366. ISBN 978-0806130118. JSTOR 41171982.
- Nolan, Frederick (2003). The Wild West: History, Myth & The Making of America: History, Myth & The Making of America. London: Arcturus Publishing Limited. ISBN 978-1848585102.
