= Harry N. Morse =

American lawman (1835–1912)

Henry Nicholson Morse
- Born: c. 1835
- Died: 1912
- Known for: Sheriff of Alameda County (1864–1878), Founder of Harry N. Morse Detective Agency
- Police career
- Country: Alameda County Sheriff's Office
- Allegiance: United States of America
- Department: Alameda County Sheriff's Office
- Service years: 1864–1878
- Rank: Sheriff
- Other work: Private detective, founder of Morse Detective Agency

Henry Nicholson Morse (c. 1835-1912), "bloodhound of the far west," was an Old West lawman. Elected September 2, 1863 served from 1864 to 1878, as the sheriff of the Alameda County Sheriff's Office of Alameda County, California. He was a Republican. He later founded the Harry N. Morse Detective Agency in California. One of his accomplishments was to help (along with his associate James Hume) identify Charles E. Boles as the perpetrator of the Black Bart stagecoach robberies. Other notable early California outlaws he helped bring to justice include Bartolo Sepulveda, Narrato Ponce, "Red-Handed Procopio, and Juan Soto.

== Career ==
Morse made his reputation by breaking up the gangs of Hispanic bandidos that infested central and southern California in the 1860s and 1870s. He shot and killed the notorious outlaw Narato Ponce after fighting two desperate gun duels with him, wounding Ponce in the first fight, then tracking him down and killing him in a second shootout months later. He captured Procopio Bustamante, nephew of the legendary Joaquin Murrieta, in a San Francisco brothel in 1872. He tracked the Tiburcio Vasquez gang for two months and 2700 miles, finally locating him in an adobe house in what is now West Hollywood. Morse provided the tip to Los Angeles County Sheriff Billy Rowland, whose posse captured Vasquez in 1874. After leaving the post of Alameda County sheriff in 1878, he formed his own private detective agency. In 1883 he captured Charles E. Boles, better known as Black Bart, the Poet Highwayman, in San Francisco. He broke up the Harkins Opium Smuggling Ring which resulted in the prosecution of a corrupt federal magistrate in San Francisco. He investigated San Francisco's Dupont Street Frauds case of the 1880s, exposing the corruption of the city's mayor, Andrew J. Bryant. He worked on the defense of Theodore Durrant, the "Beast in the Belfry" who committed several sex murders in San Francisco. Durrant was convicted and executed on the gallows in San Quentin. His last big case was the poisoning death of Jane Stanford, founder of Stanford University, in 1905.

== Personal life ==
In 1855, while working as a butcher, Morse courted Virginia Heslep, daughter of the Sacramento lawyer Augustus M. Heslep. Her father, wary of strangers following the recent axe murder of his brother and regarding the young tradesman as unworthy of his educated daughter, refused to consent to the match. But Virginia's heart was firmly set. Morse climbed through a window of the Heslep home one night and carried her off. The couple wed in Oakland on September 14, 1855, before her father could intervene. Morse later went into business with Virginia's brother Philander Heslep, with whom he opened a flour mill in Hayward that was destroyed in the 1868 Hayward earthquake, causing both men a substantial financial loss.

== Sources ==
- John Boessenecker. Lawman: the Life and times of Harry Morse, 1835-1912. Norman: University of Oklahoma Press, 1998
- John Boessenecker. Bandido: The Life and Times of Tiburcio Vasquez. Norman: University of Oklahoma Press, 2010.
- Bill O'Neal, Encyclopedia of Western Gunfighters. Norman: University of Oklahoma, 1979, pp. 328–239
- Mitchel P. Roth, James Stuart Olson, Historical Dictionary of Law Enforcement. Westport, Greenwood Press, 2001, p. 82
