= Stagecoach =

Horse-drawn public transport coach

Stagecoach

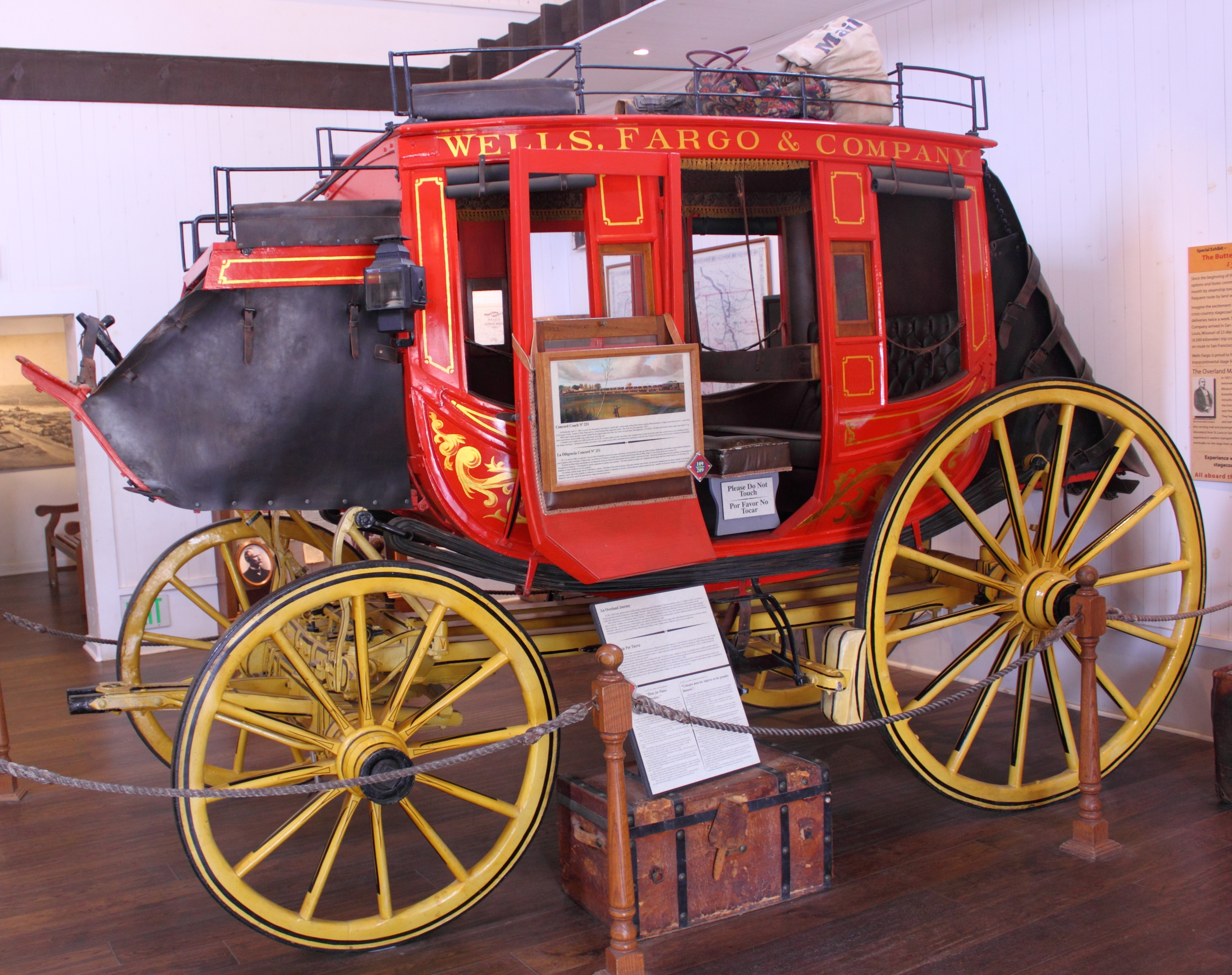
Preserved Concord stagecoach in Wells Fargo livery

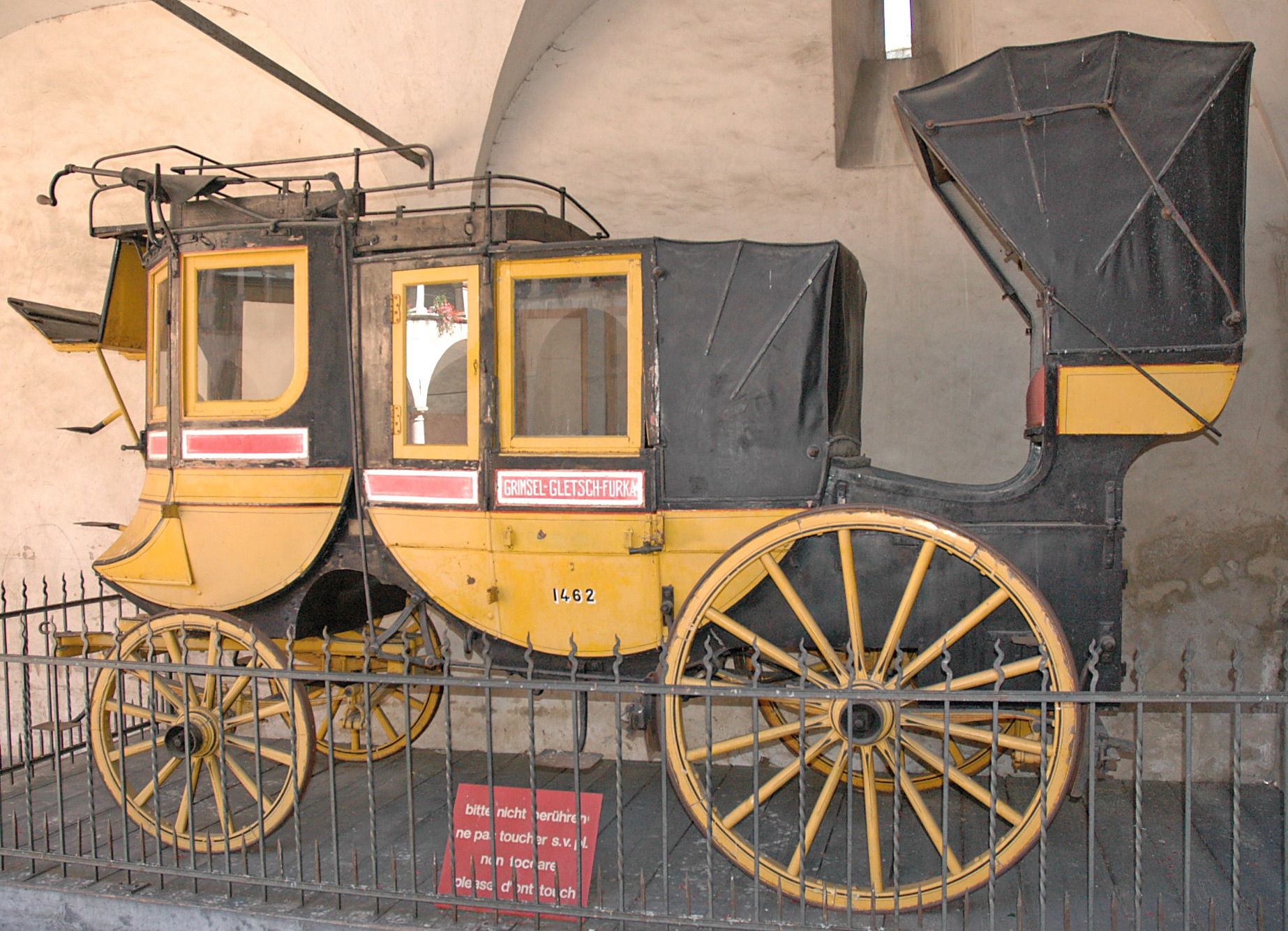
Postcoach or diligence in Switzerland

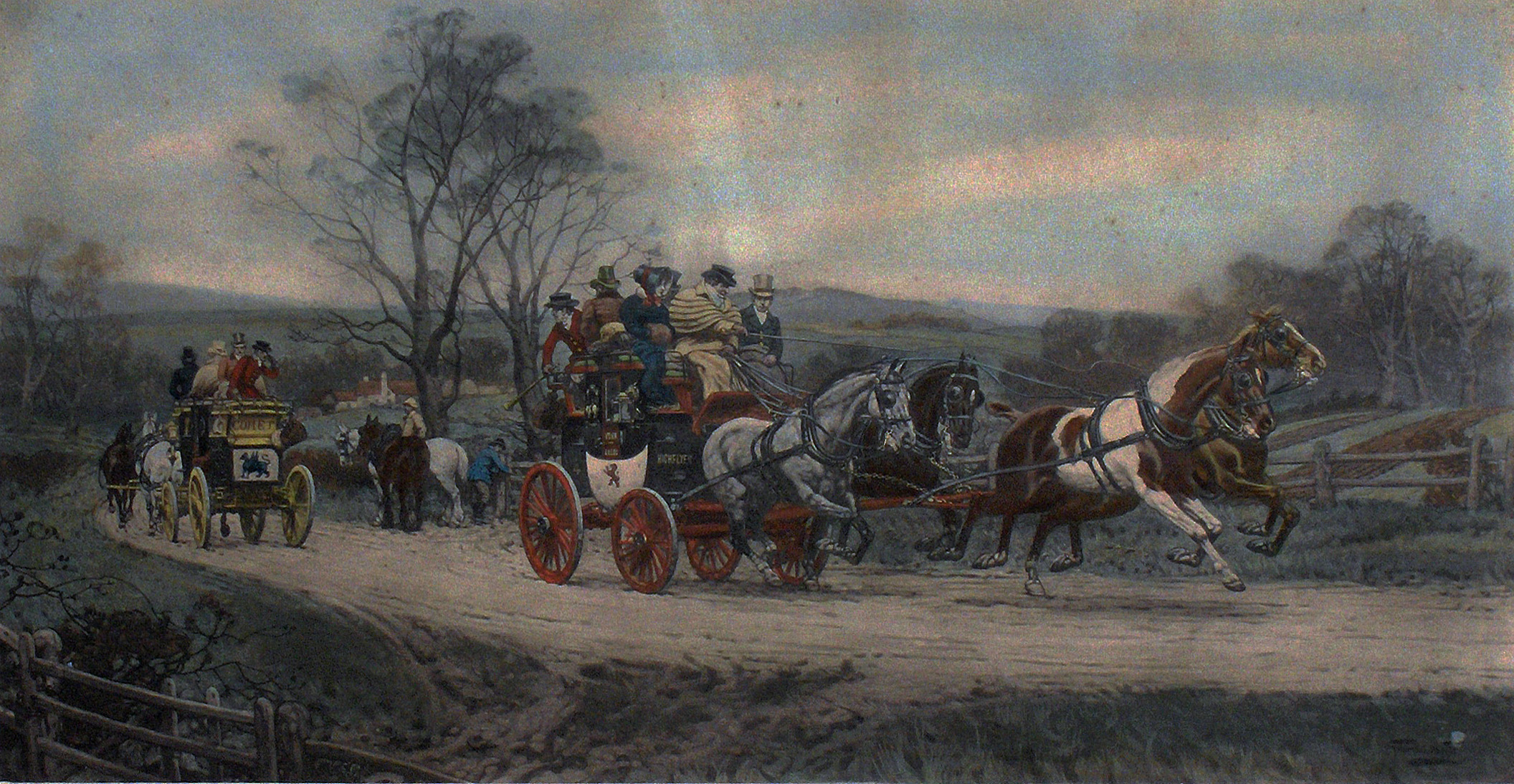
Behind time, anonymous engraving of a stagecoach in England

A stagecoach (also: stage coach, stage, road coach, diligence) is a four-wheeled public transport coach used to carry paying passengers and light packages on journeys long enough to need a change of horses. It is strongly sprung and generally drawn by four horses although some versions are drawn by six horses.

Commonly used before steam-powered rail transport was available, a stagecoach made long scheduled trips using stage stations or posts where the stagecoach's horses would be replaced by fresh horses. The business of running stagecoaches or the act of journeying in them was known as staging.

Some familiar images of the stagecoach are that of a Royal Mail coach passing through a turnpike gate, a Dickensian passenger coach covered in snow pulling up at a coaching inn, a highwayman demanding a coach to "stand and deliver" and a Wells Fargo stagecoach arriving at or leaving an American frontier town. The yard of ale drinking glass is associated by legend with stagecoach drivers, though it was mainly used for drinking feats and special toasts.

== Description ==
The stagecoach was a closed four-wheeled vehicle drawn by horses or hard-going mules. It was regularly used as a public conveyance on an established route usually to a regular schedule. Spent horses were replaced with fresh horses at stage stations, posts, or relays. In addition to the stage driver or coachman who guided the vehicle, a shotgun messenger armed with a coach gun might travel as a guard beside him. Thus, the origin of the phrase "riding shotgun".

Always a headed vehicle, fitted with roof seats or gammon boards, from the early 19th century. ... Driven from an elevated box seat, its footboard supported by brackets. At first unsprung or dead axle, but later hung on braces, elbow and finally Telegraph springs, as with the Mail Coach. ... Most stage coaches were named and painted in special liveries.

— D. J. M. Smith in A Dictionary of Horse Drawn Vehicles

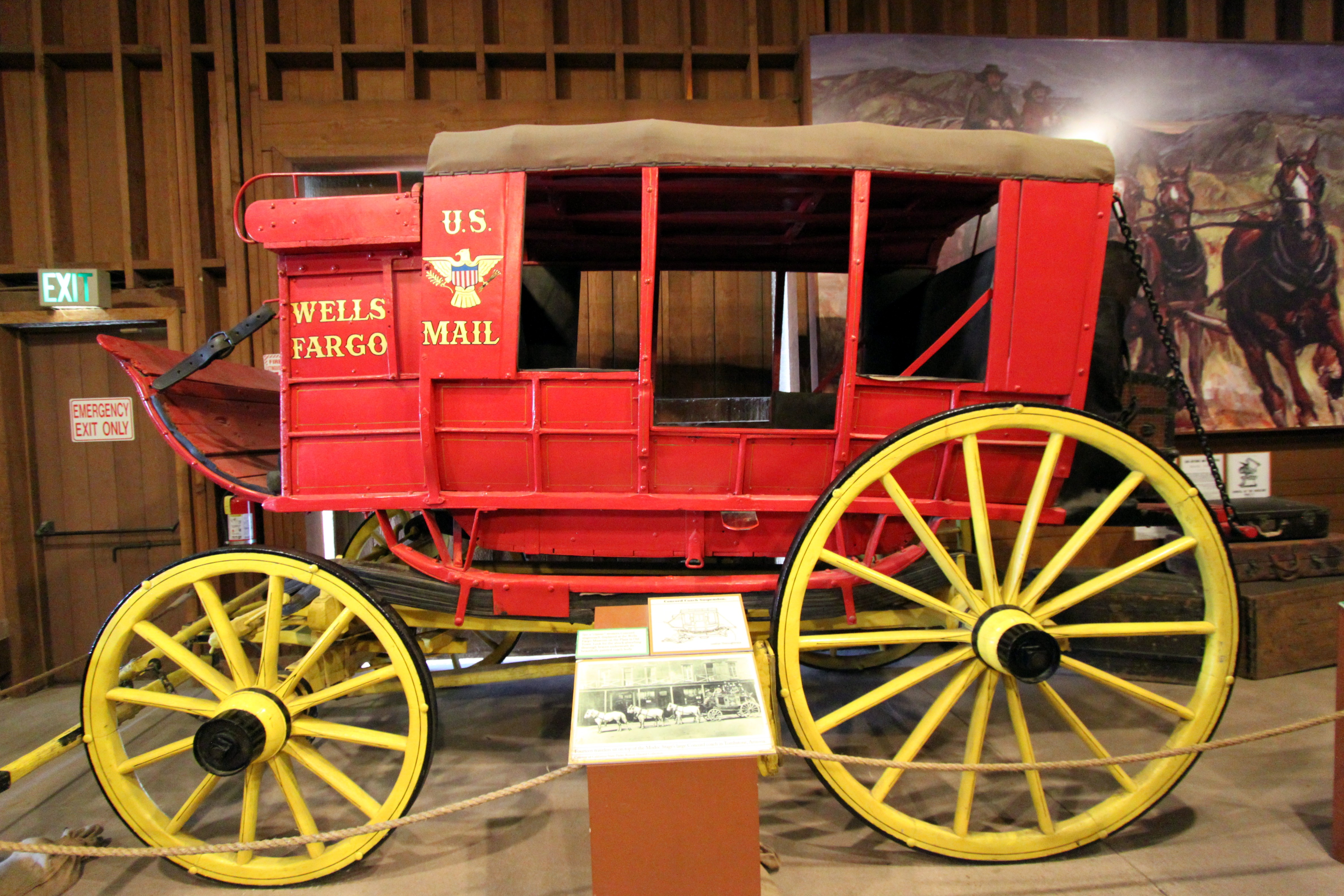
Wells Fargo mud-coach

The American mud wagon was an earlier, smaller, and cruder vehicle, being mostly open-sided with minimal protection from weather, causing passengers to risk being mud-splashed. A canvas-topped stage wagon was used for freight and passengers, and it had a lower center of gravity, making it harder to overturn.

Until the late 18th century, stagecoaches traveled at an average speed of about 5 miles per hour (8 km/h), with the average daily mileage traversed approximately 60 to 70 miles (97 to 113 km). With road improvements and the development of steel springs, speeds increased. By 1836 the scheduled coach left London at 19:30, travelled through the night (without lights) and arrived in Liverpool at 16:50 the next day, a distance of about 220 miles (350 km), doubling the overall average speed to about 10 miles per hour (16 km/h), including stops to change horses.

== Historical context ==
[Stage coaches operated] between stages or stopping places, both in the ancient world and modern Europe/America. Revived in England during the late 16th or early 17th centuries, although a nationwide system was not organised until 1658. Considerable improvements came during the 18th century with the turnpike system and better engineering of public roads. ... Forced from its main trunk routes by railway competition from the late 1830's, although some lingered in remoter areas until the 1850's. In North America a few Concord Coaches survived until the first half of the 20th century.

— D. J. M. Smith in A Dictionary of Horse Drawn Vehicles

=== Britain ===
==== Origins ====
The first crude depiction of a coach was in an English manuscript from the 13th century. The first recorded stagecoach route in Britain started in 1610 and ran from Edinburgh to Leith. This was followed by a steady proliferation of other routes around the island. By the mid 17th century, a basic stagecoach infrastructure had been put in place. A string of coaching inns operated as stopping points for travellers on the route between London and Liverpool. The stagecoach would depart every Monday and Thursday and took roughly ten days to make the journey during the summer months. Stagecoaches also became widely adopted for travel in and around London by mid-century and generally travelled at a few miles per hour. Shakespeare's first plays were performed at coaching inns such as The George Inn, Southwark.

By the end of the 17th century stagecoach routes ran up and down the three main roads in England. The London-York route was advertised in 1698.

The novelty of this method of transport excited much controversy at the time. One pamphleteer denounced the stagecoach as a "great evil [...] mischievous to trade and destructive to the public health". Another writer argued it was an "excellent arrangement" for carrying passengers (men and women) and mail, covering in an hour distances other countries' services required a day.

The speed of travel remained constant until the mid-18th century. Reforms of the turnpike trusts, new methods of road building and the improved construction of coaches led to a sustained rise in the comfort and speed of the average journey - from an average journey length of 2 days for the Cambridge-London route in 1750 to a length of under 7 hours in 1820.

Robert Hooke helped in the construction of some of the first spring-suspended coaches in the 1660s and spoked wheels with iron rim brakes were introduced, improving the characteristics of the coach.

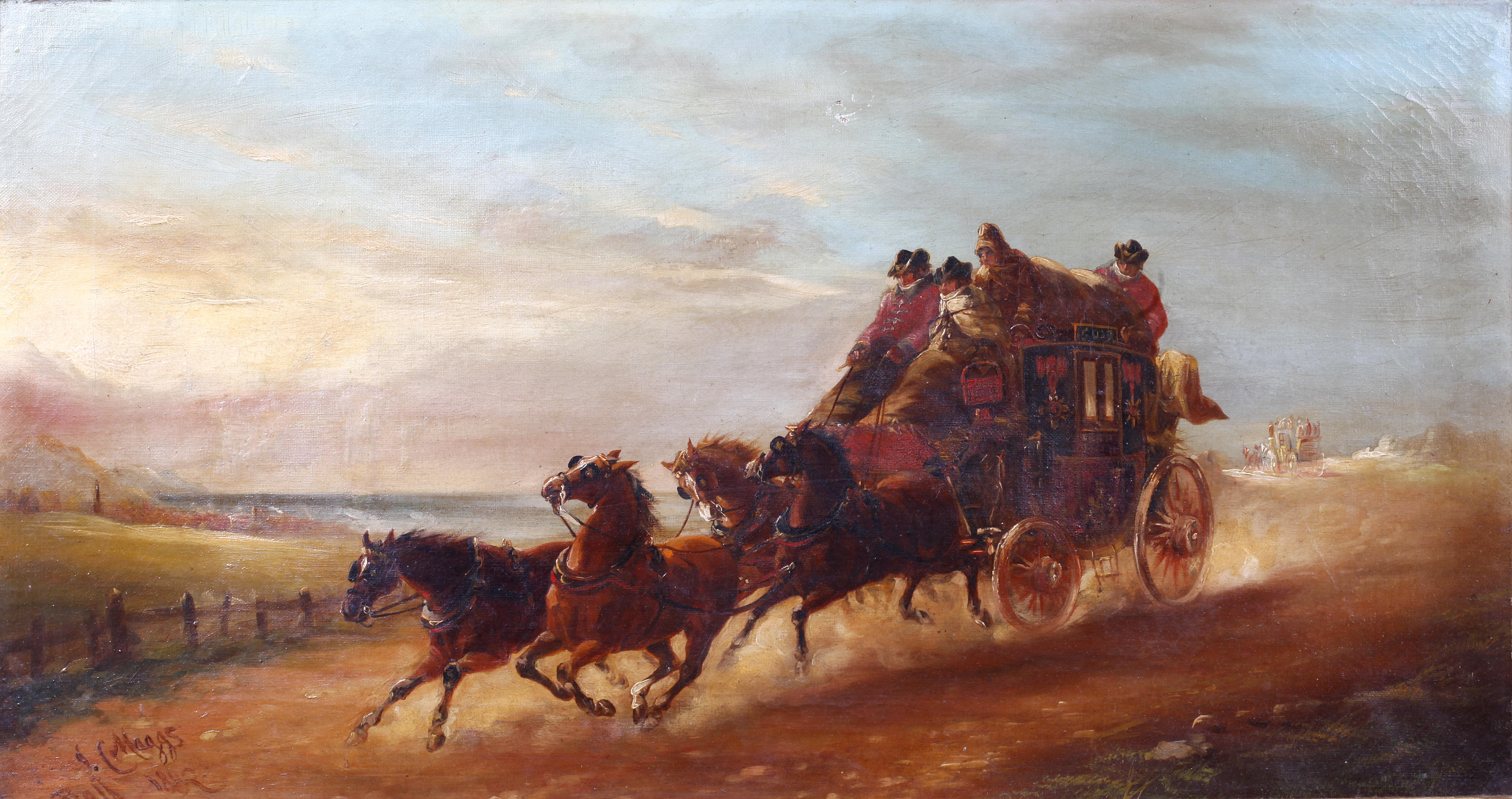
A Greyhound or Flying coach

In 1754, a Manchester-based company began a new service called the "Flying Coach". It was advertised with the following announcement - "However incredible it may appear, this coach will actually (barring accidents) arrive in London in four days and a half after leaving Manchester." A similar service was begun from Liverpool three years later, using coaches with steel spring suspension. This coach took an unprecedented three days to reach London with an average speed of eight miles per hour (13 km/h).

==== Royal Mail stagecoaches ====
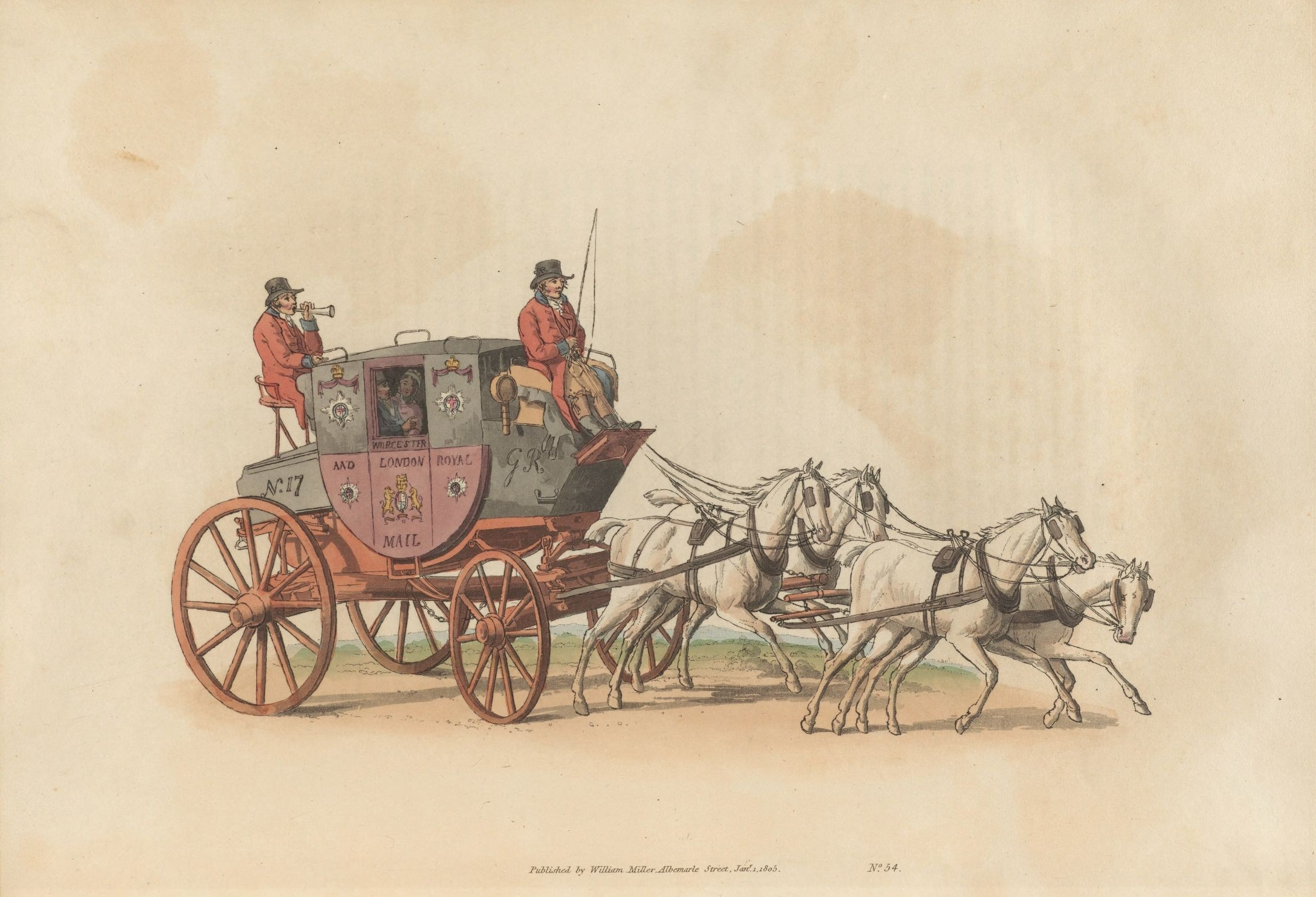
Mail coach decorated in the black and maroon Post Office livery, 1804

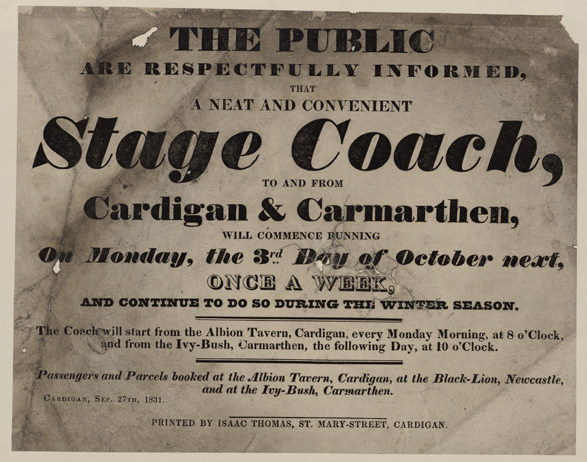
A public notice advertising a new stage coach service in west Wales, 1831

Even more dramatic improvements were made by John Palmer at the British Post Office. The postal delivery service in Britain had existed in the same form for about 150 years—from its introduction in 1635, mounted carriers had ridden between "posts" where the postmaster would remove the letters for the local area before handing the remaining letters and any additions to the next rider. The riders were frequent targets for robbers, and the system was inefficient.

Palmer made much use of the "flying" stagecoach services between cities in the course of his business, and noted that it seemed far more efficient than the system of mail delivery then in operation. His travel from Bath to London took a single day to the mail's three days. It occurred to him that this stagecoach service could be developed into a national mail delivery service, so in 1782 he suggested to the Post Office in London that they take up the idea. He met resistance from officials who believed that the existing system could not be improved, but eventually the Chancellor of the Exchequer, William Pitt, allowed him to carry out an experimental run between Bristol and London. Under the old system the journey had taken up to 38 hours. The stagecoach, funded by Palmer, left Bristol at 4 pm on 2 August 1784 and arrived in London just 16 hours later.

Impressed by the trial run, Pitt authorised the creation of new routes. Within the month the service had been extended from London to Norwich, Nottingham, Liverpool and Manchester, and by the end of 1785 services to the following major towns and cities of England and Wales had also been linked: Leeds, Dover, Portsmouth, Poole, Exeter, Gloucester, Worcester, Holyhead and Carlisle. A service to Edinburgh was added the next year, and Palmer was rewarded by being made Surveyor and Comptroller General of the Post Office. By 1797 there were forty-two routes.

==== Improved coach design ====
The period from 1790 to 1830 saw great improvements in the design of coaches, most notably by John Besant in 1792 and 1795. His coach had a greatly improved turning capacity and braking system, and a novel feature that prevented the wheels from falling off while the coach was in motion. Besant, with his partner John Vidler, enjoyed a monopoly on the supply of stagecoaches to the Royal Mail and a virtual monopoly on their upkeep and servicing for the following few decades.

Steel springs had been used in suspensions for vehicles since 1695. Coachbuilder Obadiah Elliott obtained a patent covering the use of elliptic springs—which was not his invention. His patent lasted 14 years delaying development because Elliott allowed no others to license and use his patent. Elliott mounted each wheel with two durable elliptic steel leaf springs on each side and the body of the carriage was fixed directly to the springs attached to the axles. After the expiry of his patent most British horse carriages were equipped with elliptic springs; wooden springs in the case of light one-horse vehicles to avoid taxation, and steel springs in larger vehicles.

==== Improved roads ====
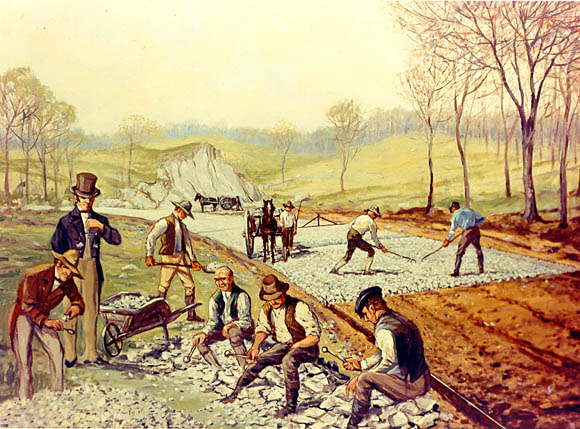
Construction of a macadamized road in the United States (1823). These roads allowed stagecoaches to travel at much greater speeds.

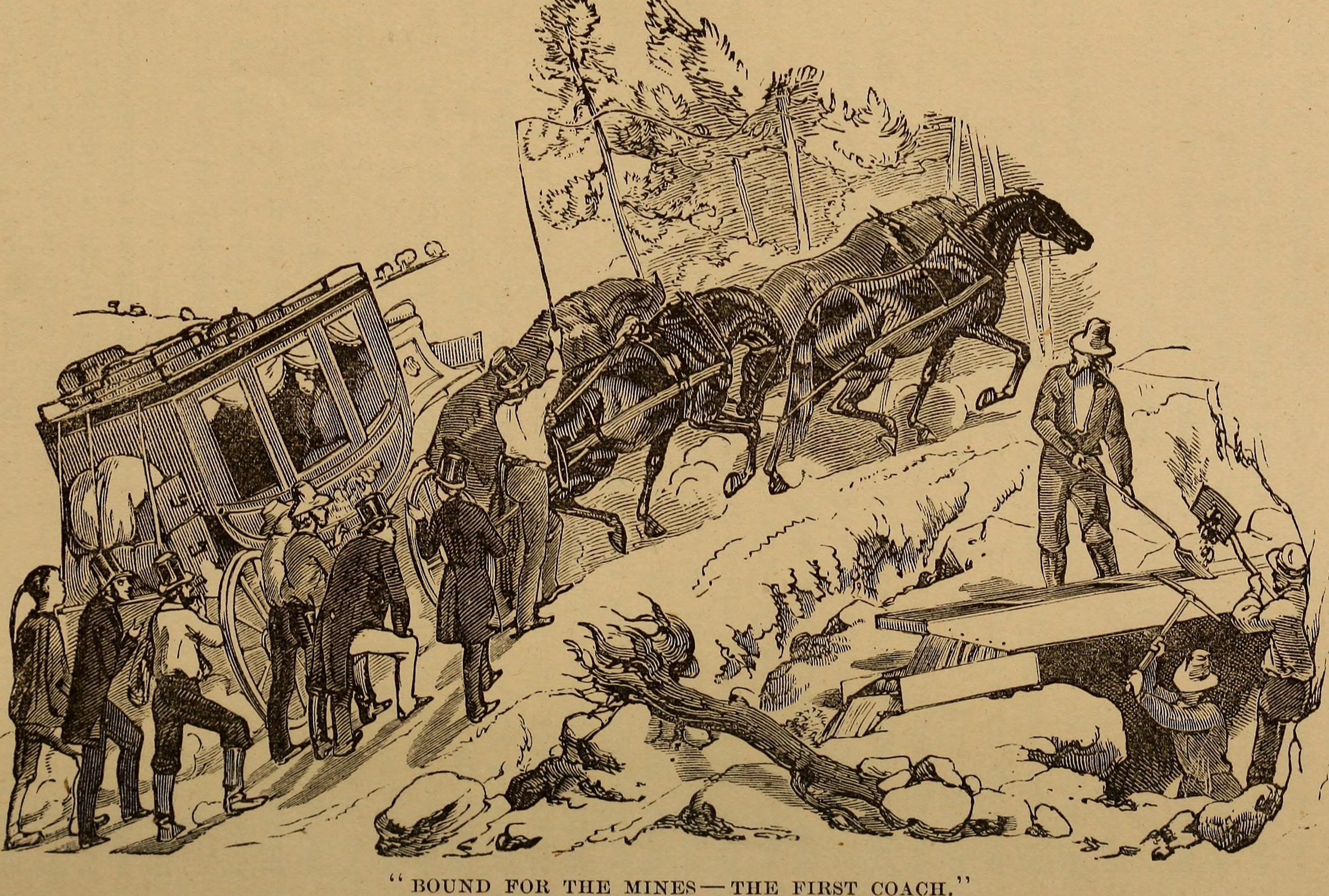
Gentlemen ordered out of the coach to lighten the load on the horses. Three put their shoulders to the back.

Steady improvements in road construction were also made at this time, most importantly the widespread implementation of Macadam roads up and down the country. The speed of coaches in this period rose from around 6 miles per hour (9.7 km/h) (including stops for provisioning) to 8 miles per hour (13 km/h) and greatly increased the level of mobility in the country, both for people and for mail. Each route had an average of four coaches operating on it at one time - two for both directions and a further two spares in case of a breakdown en route. Joseph Ballard described the stagecoach service between Manchester and Liverpool in 1815 as having price competition between coaches, with timely service and clean accommodations at inns.

==== Taxation and regulation ====
Stagecoaches in Victorian Britain were heavily taxed on the number of passenger seats. If more passengers were carried than the licence allowed there were penalties to pay. The lawyer Stanley Harris (1816–1897) writes in his books Old Coaching Days and The Coaching Age that he knew of informers ready to report any breach of regulations to the authorities. This could be overloading of passengers in excess of the licence or minor matters such as luggage too high on the roof. They did this in return for a portion of any fines imposed, sometimes as much as half. The tax paid on passenger seats was a major expense for coach operators. Harris gives an example of the tax payable on the London to Newcastle coach route (278 miles). Annual tax amounted to £2,529 for 15 passengers per coach (4 inside and 11 outside). Annual tolls were £2,537. The hire of the four coach vehicles needed was £1,274. The 250 horses needed for this service also needed to be paid for. Operators could reduce their tax burden by one seventh by operating a six-day-a-week service instead of a seven-day service.

==== Stage Coaches Acts of Great Britain ====
Stage Coaches, etc. (Great Britain) Act 1810
- Act of Parliament
- Parliament of the United Kingdom
- Long title: An act to repeal Three Acts, made in the Twenty eighth, Thirtieth and Forty sixth Years of His present Majesty, for limiting the Number of Persons to be carried on the Outside of Stage Coaches or other Carriages, and to enact other Regulations for carrying the Objects of the said Acts into Effect.
- Citation: 50 Geo. 3. c. 48
- Territorial extent: United Kingdom

Dates
- Royal assent: 9 June 1810
- Commencement: 9 June 1810 (Note: The Acts of Parliament (Commencement) Act 1793.)
- Repealed: 10 October 1832
Other legislation
Repeals/revokes	Stage Coaches Act 1788; Stage Coaches Act 1790; Stage Coaches, etc. Act 1806
Repealed by	Stage Carriages Act 1832

Status: Repealed

Text of statute as originally enacted

- Stage Coaches Act 1788 (28 Geo. 3. c. 57)
- Stage Coaches Act 1790 (30 Geo. 3. c. 36)
- Stage Coaches, etc. Act 1806
- Stage Coaches, etc. (Great Britain) Act 1810 (50 Geo. 3. c. 48) repealed and replaced previous regulations relating to stage coaches
- Stage Carriages Act 1832 (2 & 3 Will. 4. c. 120) consolidated enactments relating to the management of taxes on stagecoaches

==== Decline and evolution ====
The development of railways in the 1830s spelled the end for stagecoaches and mail coaches. The first rail delivery between Liverpool and Manchester took place on 11 November 1830. By the early 1840s most London-based coaches had been withdrawn from service.

Some stagecoaches remained in use for commercial or recreational purposes. They came to be known as road coaches and were used by their enterprising (or nostalgic) owners to provide scheduled passenger services where rail had not yet reached and also on certain routes at certain times of the year for the pleasure of an (often amateur) coachman and his daring passengers.

==== Competitive display and sport ====
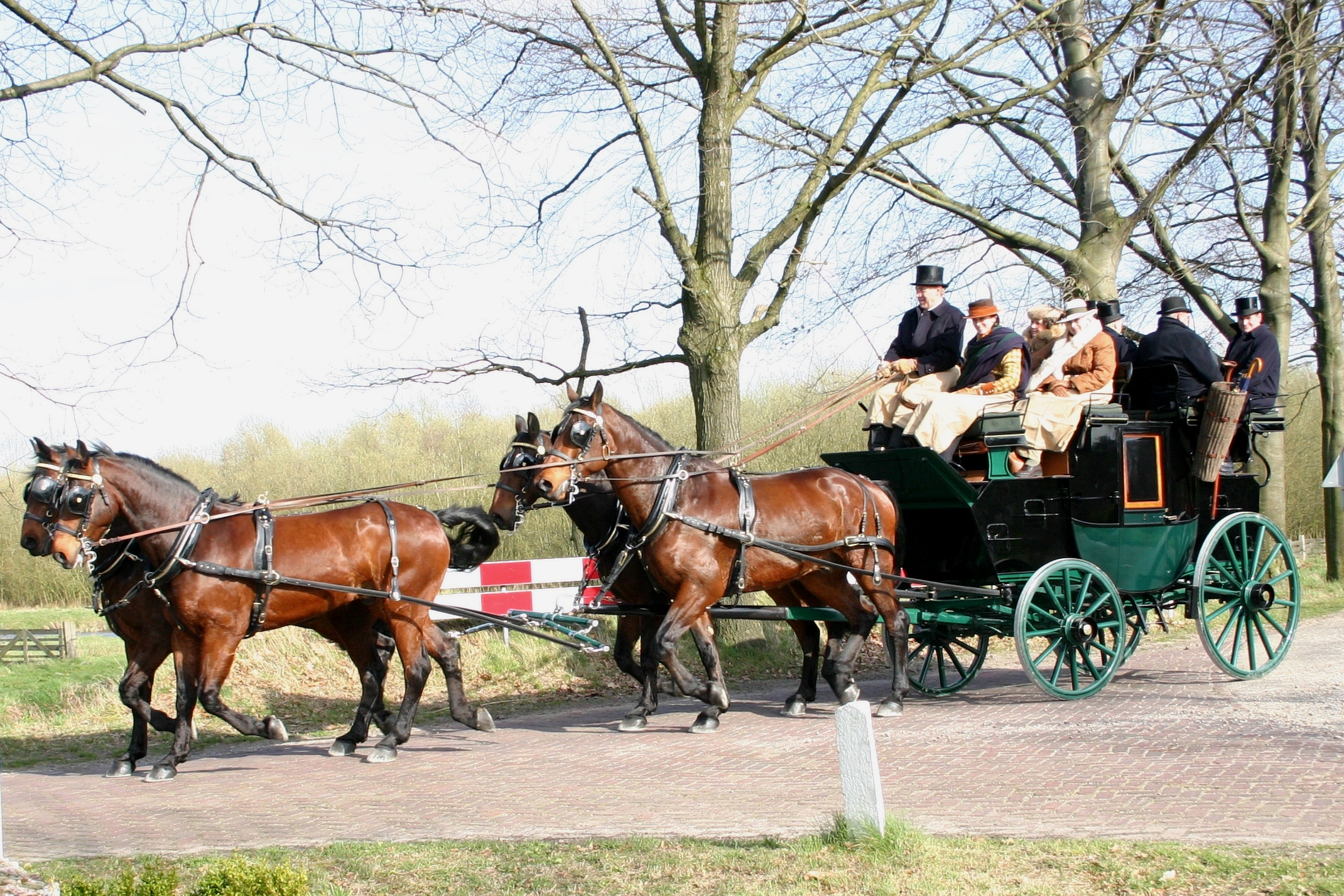
Park drag built by Brewster in 1887

While stagecoaches vanished as rail penetrated the countryside the 1860s did see the start of a coaching revival spurred on by the popularity of Four-in-hand driving as a sporting pursuit (the Four-In-Hand Driving Club was founded in 1856 and the Coaching Club in 1871).

New stagecoaches often known as Park Drags began to be built to order. Some owners would parade their vehicles and magnificently dressed passengers in fashionable locations. Other owners would take more enthusiastic suitably-dressed passengers and indulge in competitive driving. Very similar in design to stagecoaches their vehicles were lighter and sportier.

These owners were (often very expert) amateur gentlemen-coachmen, occasionally gentlewomen. (Note: From Satire V. On Women More than one steed must Delia's empire feel, Who sits triumphant o'er the flying wheel; And, as she guides it through th' admiring throng, With what air she smacks the silken thong; Graceful as John she moderates the reins, and whistles her sweet diuretic strains. Sesostris like, such charioteers as these May drive six harnessed monarchs, if they please. They drive, row, run, with love of glory smit; Leap, swim, shoot flying, and pronounce on wit. — Edward Young) A professional coachman might accompany them to avert disaster. Professionals called these vehicles 'butterflies'. They only appeared in summer.

=== Continental Europe ===
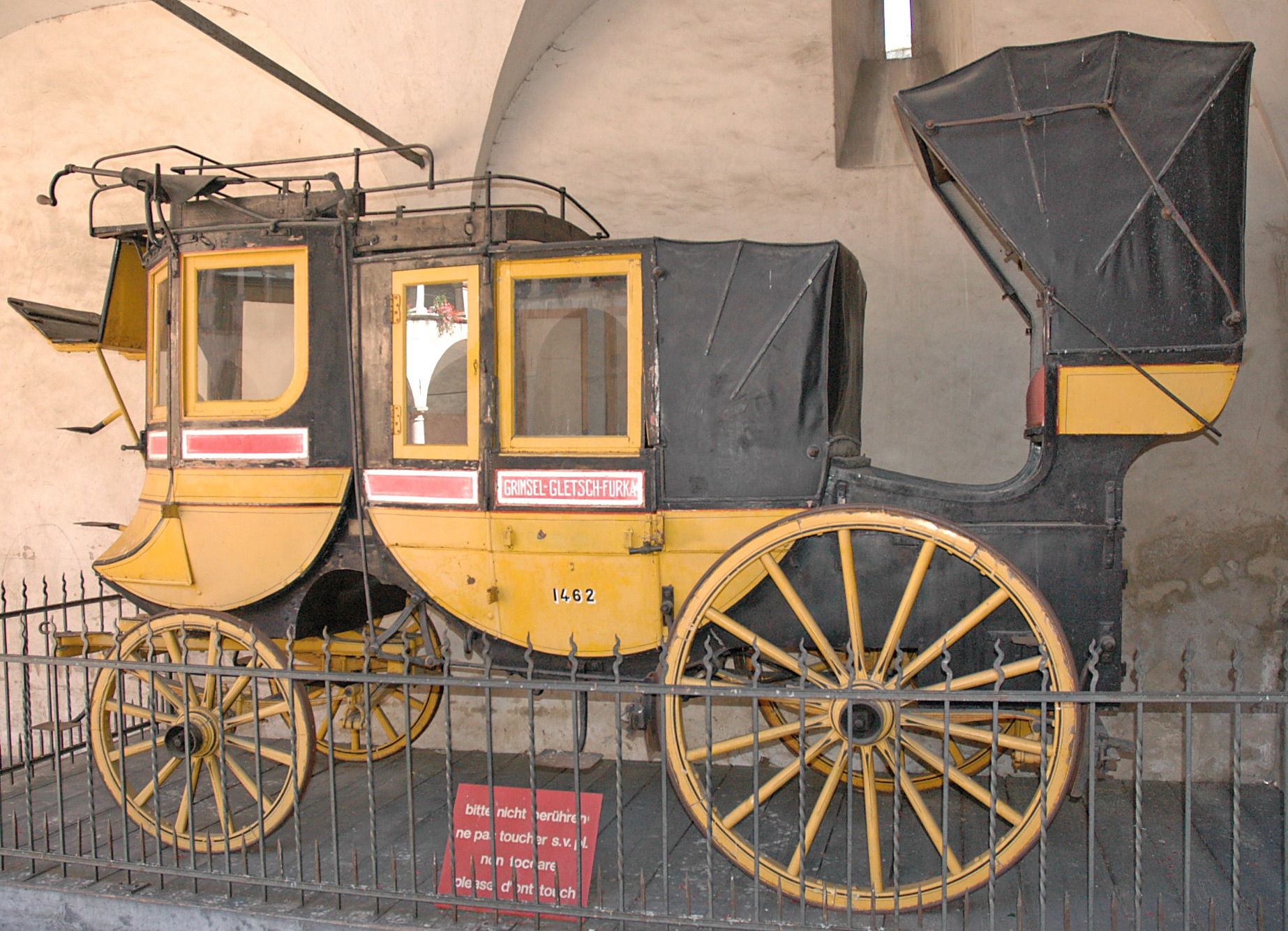
A Swiss Postkutsche

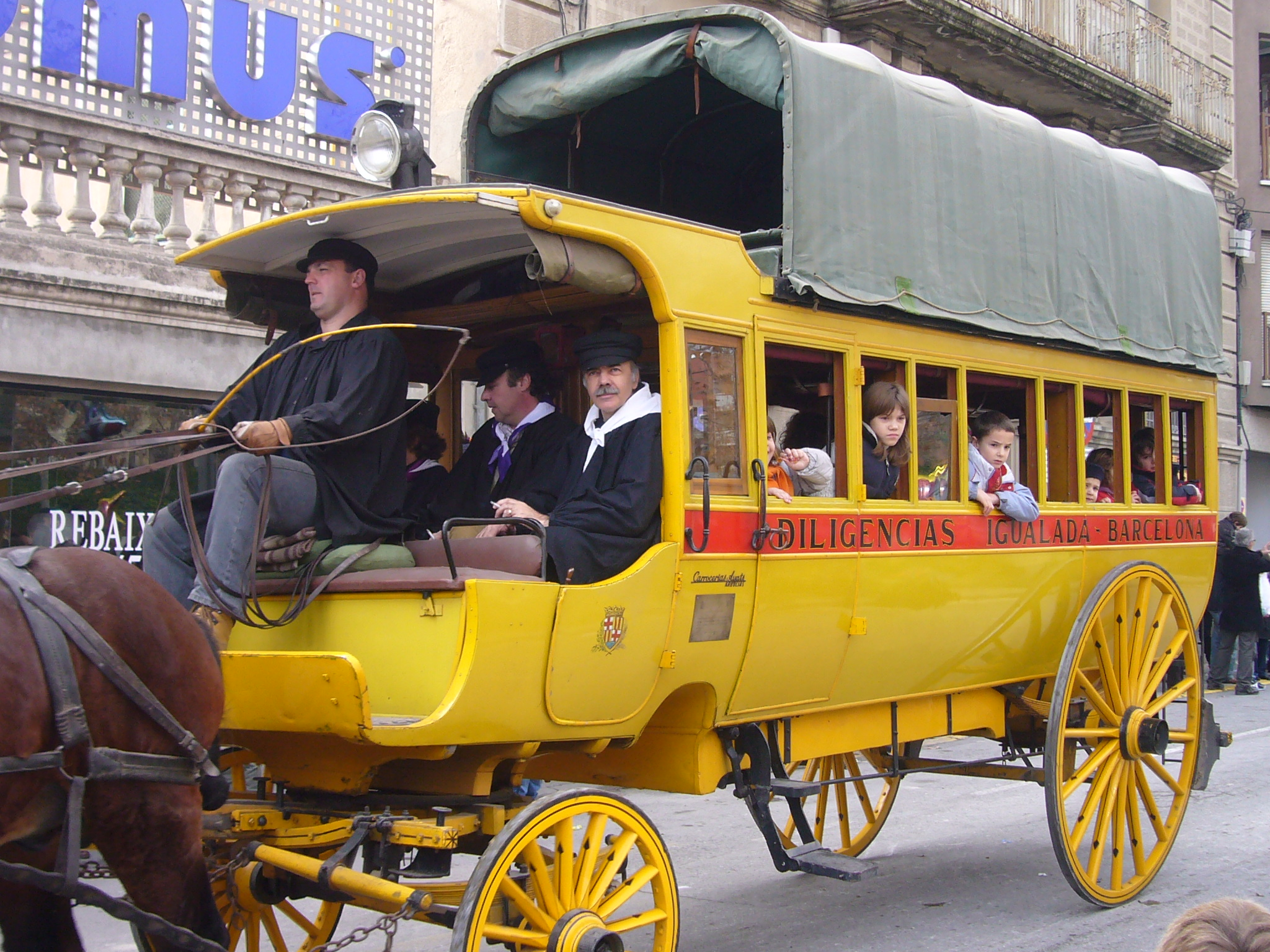
Spanish diligencia with luggage deck on the roof

Across continental Europe, stagecoaches and long-distance public coaches were known by a variety of regional terms. These terms reflect local postal systems and coach traditions, many of which paralleled or adapted the French diligence model.

- France – diligence (long-distance public coach); turgotine (18th-century mail coach).
- Spain – diligencia (public stagecoach service).
- Italy – diligenza or carrozza di posta (postal coach).
- Portugal – mala-posta (mail coach service).
- Belgium and the Netherlands – postwagen or diligence (postal or public coach).
- Germany, Austria, Switzerland – Postkutsche, Postwagen, or Malle-Post (mail coach).
- Scandinavia – postkjørsel (Norway), diligens (Sweden) for long-distance coach travel.
- Austria – Postkutsche (Austrian imperial mail coach).
- Hungary – posta or postakocsi.
- Poland – poczta for postal coach routes.
- Russia – yam or yamshchina for relay-station coach and courier systems.

=== France ===
==== Diligence ====
Diligence operated by Laffitte & Caillard (engraving)

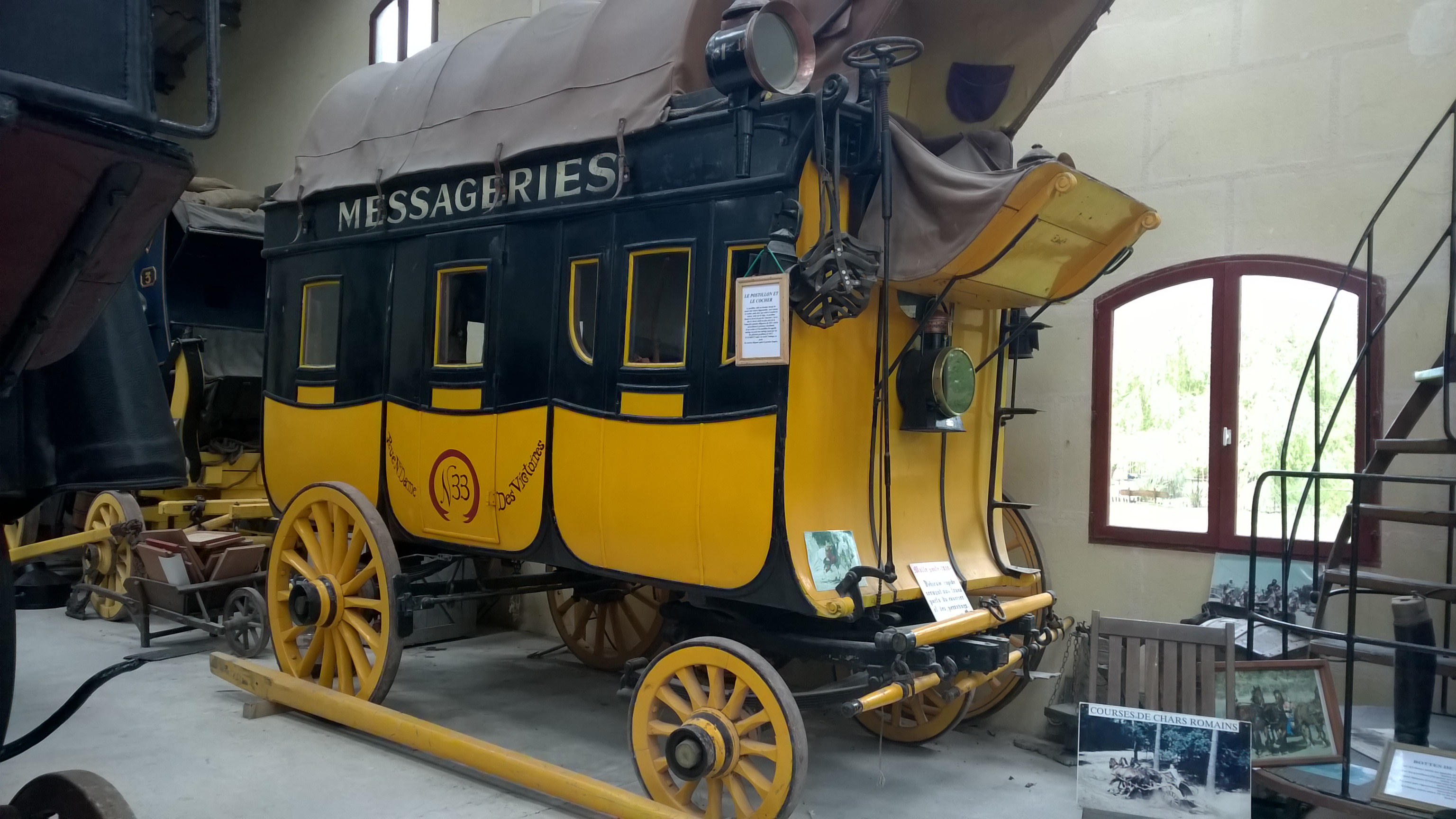
A French diligence

The diligence, a large solidly built stagecoach with multiple horses, was the French vehicle for public conveyance with minor varieties in Germany such as the Stellwagen (stagecoach) and Eilwagen (express coach). In 1830, Wheaton wrote that the diligence is made of three bodies, and noted its weight by writing, "the timber employed in constructing the machine, would go far towards building a small barn". The harness and method of hitching is scant with ropes and bits and pieces. Horses are added when needed and there is no set number or arrangement of horses. The driver may sit on the vehicle or guide the horses as a postilion (rider).

According to Planta in 1827, the diligence is constructed of multiple bodies, two each containing 4 to 6 passengers, and a front section for 3 passengers. The front part is called a cabriolet if open (with leather covers), or a coupé if enclosed. Windows are small. A conductor, whose role is to take care of the luggage, travels either in the front compartment or outside, and remains with the vehicle for the entire journey. Passengers pay a fare for their entire journey as well as giving a gratuity to the conductor, driver and postilion at each stage.

Smith (1988) describes the diligence as:

Late 18th century name for a French public coach working on long distance routes. So-named from its reputation for promptitude and good time-keeping, as with the English Mail Coach. Although normally well-sprung and enclosed, seating eight or more passengers, some types had a semi-open seat, for three or more passengers, shared with the driver. This latter was known as the banquette. Although most vehicles were coachman driven, others were in the care of postillions. The number of horses varied according to difficulties of the route. Three, or a unicorn team were not unfamiliar, especially on the flatter roads of the north west. In Germany, Austria and some parts of Switzerland the Diligence was known as the Post Coach or Malle Post. —D. J. M. Smith in A Dictionary of Horse Drawn Vehicles

In 1803, Carr described the luggage compartments and accommodation of the diligence:

A more uncouth clumsy machine can scarcely be imagined. In the front is a cabriolet fixed to the body of the coach, for the accommodation of three passengers, who are protected from the rain above, by the projecting roof of the coach, and in front by two heavy curtains of leather, well oiled, and smelling somewhat offensively, fastened to the roof. The inside, which is capacious, and lofty, and will hold six people in great comfort is lined with leather padded, and surrounded with little pockets, in which travellers deposit their bread, snuff, night caps, and pocket handkerchiefs, which generally enjoy each others company, in the same delicate depository. From the roof depends a large net work which is generally crouded with hats, swords, and band boxes, the whole is convenient, and when all parties are seated and arranged, the accommodations are by no means unpleasant.

Upon the roof, on the outside, is the imperial, which is generally filled with six or seven persons more, and a heap of luggage, which latter also occupies the basket, and generally presents a pile, half as high again as the coach, which is secured by ropes and chains, tightened by a large iron windlass, which also constitutes another appendage of this moving mass. The body of the carriage rests upon large thongs of leather, fastened to heavy blocks of wood, instead of springs, and the whole is drawn by seven horses.

Between 1765 and 1780, new roads in France capable of taking carriages at full gallop, fast stage-coaches known as turgotines, and a larger number of staging posts cut journey times across France, sometimes by half. The decisive factor was Turgot's creation in 1775 of the Régie des diligences et messageries, the state mail-coach service.

=== United States of America ===
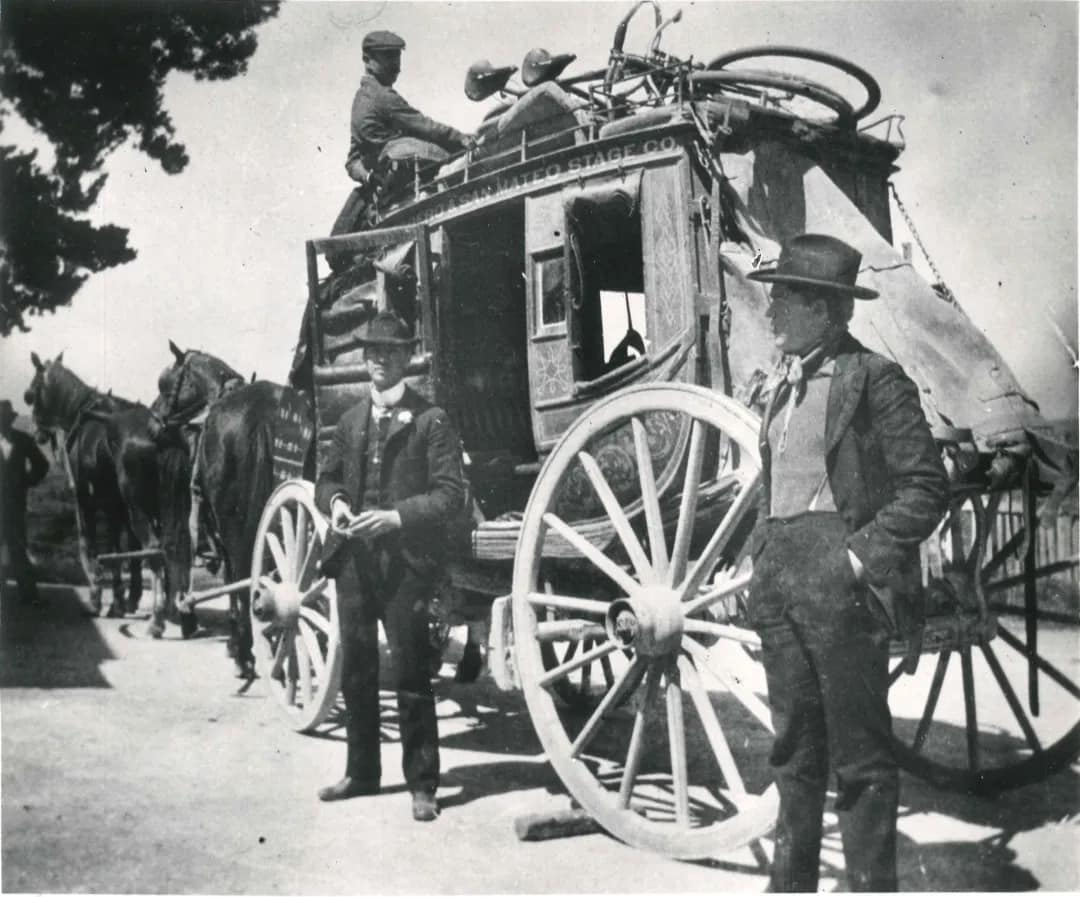
California, circa 1900

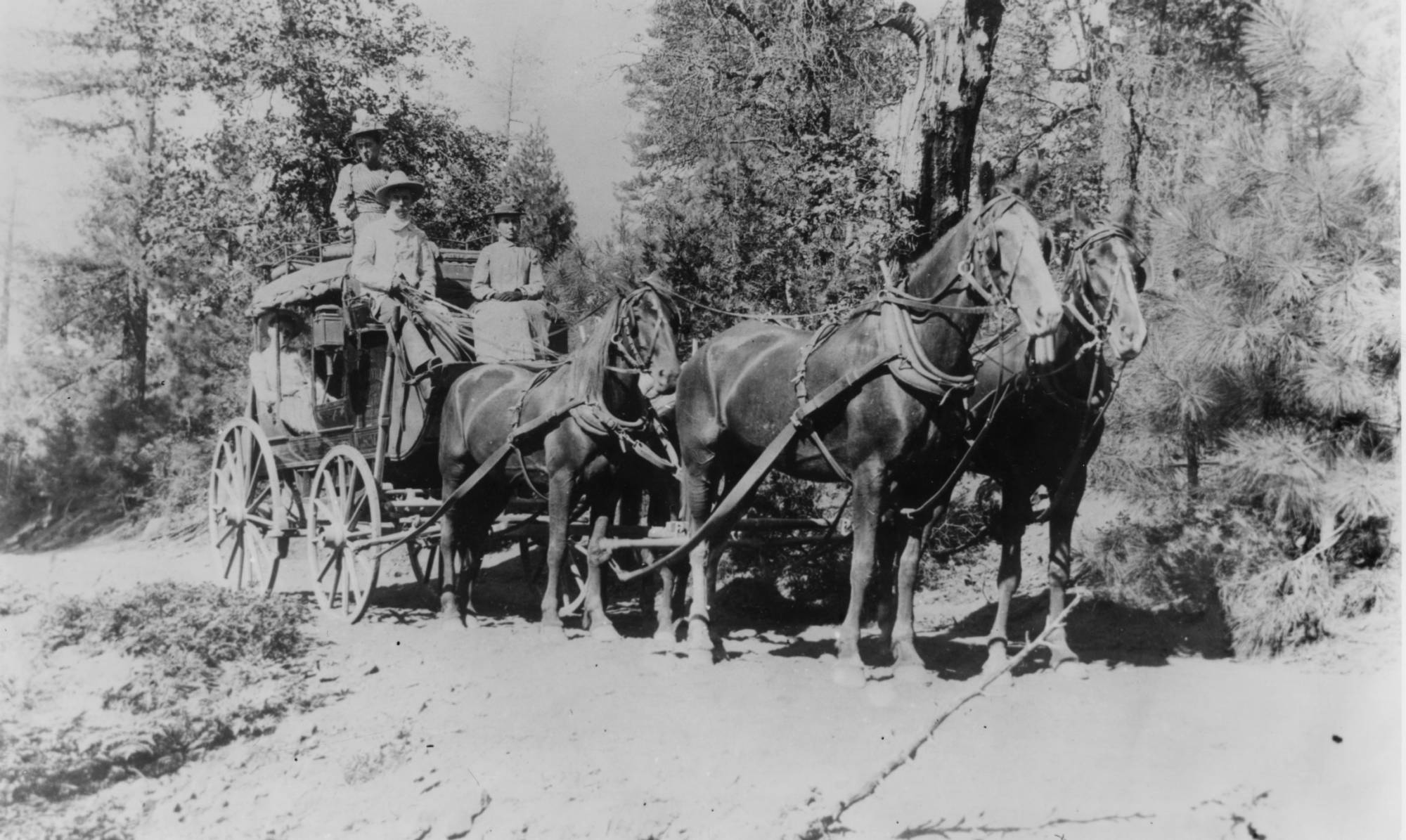
California, circa 1900

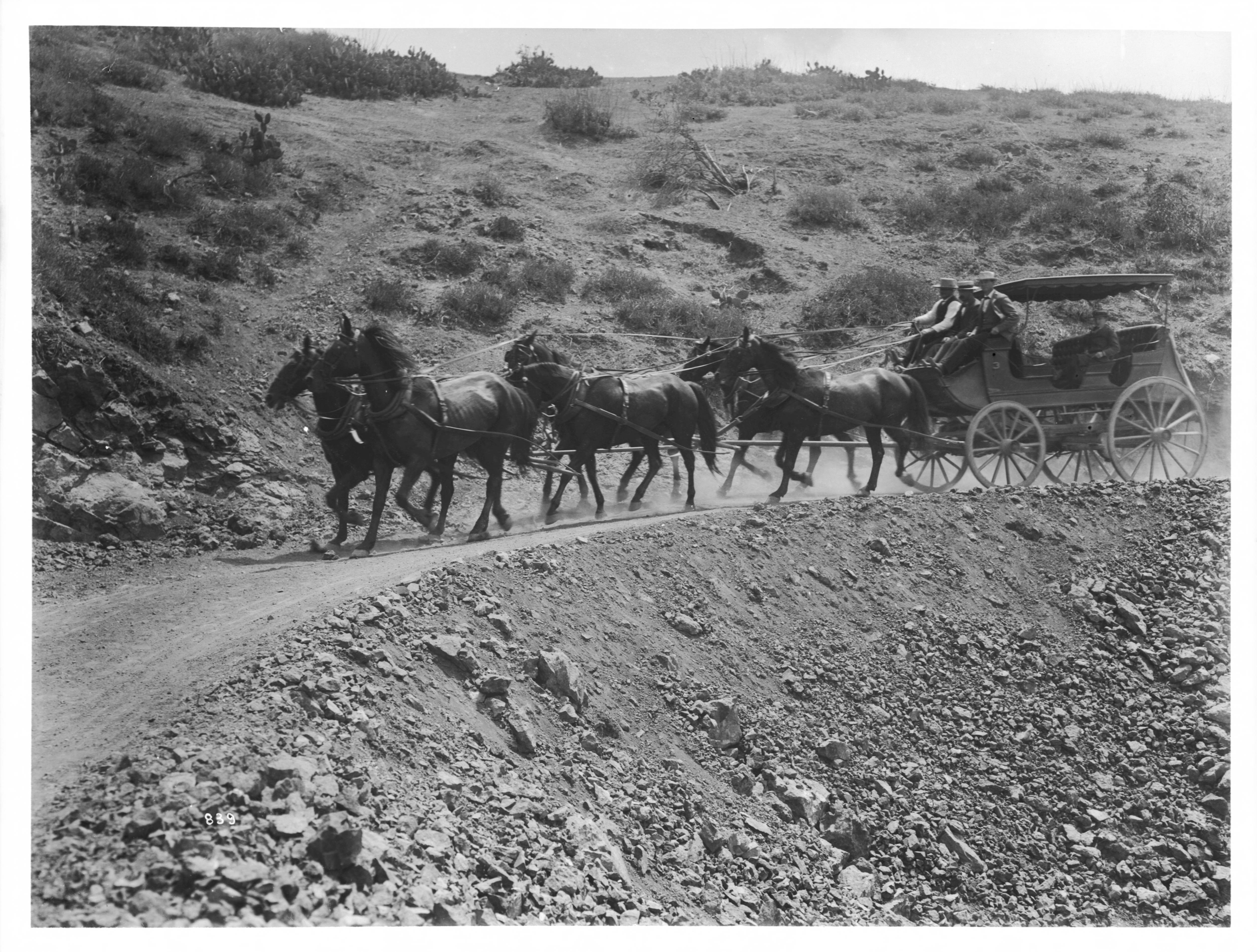
Santa Catalina Island, circa 1895-1900

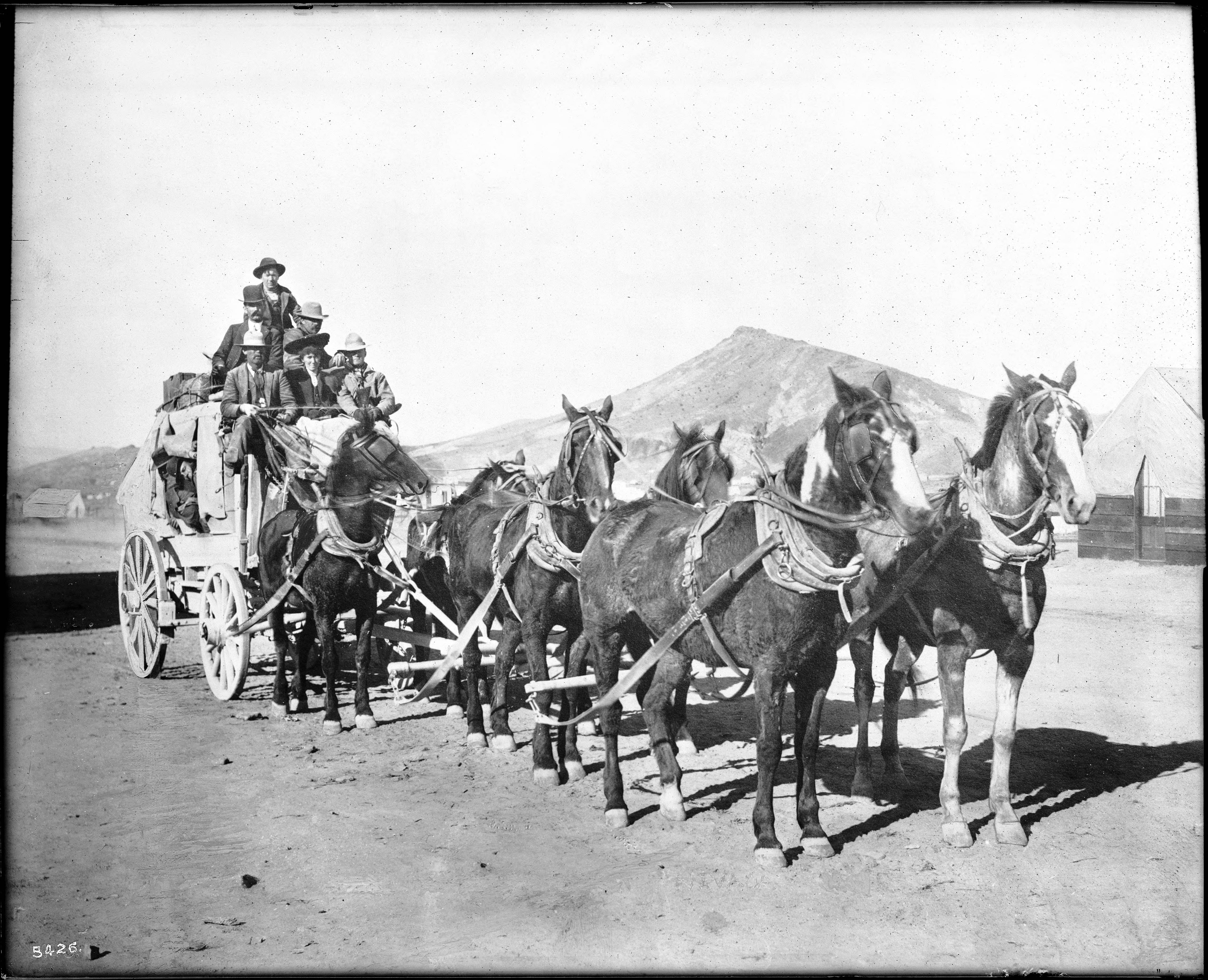
Nevada, circa 1905

Beginning in the 18th century, crude wagons began to be used to carry passengers between cities and towns, first within New England by 1744, then between New York and Philadelphia by 1756. Travel time was reduced on this later run from three days to two in 1766 with an improved coach called the Flying Machine. The first mail coaches appeared in the later 18th century carrying passengers and the mails, replacing the earlier post riders on the main roads. Coachmen carried letters, packages, and money, often transacting business or delivering messages for their customers. By 1829 Boston was the hub of 77 stagecoach lines; by 1832 there were 106. Coaches with iron or steel springs were uncomfortable and had short useful lives. Two men in Concord, New Hampshire, developed what became a popular solution. They built their first Concord stagecoach in 1827 employing long leather straps under their stagecoaches which gave a swinging motion.

Describing a journey he took in 1861, in his 1872 book, Roughing It, Mark Twain wrote that the Concord stage was like "an imposing cradle on wheels". Around twenty years later, in 1880, John Plesent Gray recorded after travelling from Tucson to Tombstone on J.D. Kinnear's mail and express line:

That day's stage ride will always live in my memory – but not for its beauty spots. Jammed like sardines on the hard seats of an old time leather spring coach – a Concord – leaving Pantano, creeping much of the way, letting the horses walk, through miles of alkali dust that the wheels rolled up in thick clouds of which we received the full benefit ... It is always a mystery to the passenger how many can be wedged into and on top of a stagecoach. If it had not been for the long stretches when the horses had to walk, enabling most of us to get out and "foot it" as a relaxation, it seems as if we could never have survived the trip.

— John Plesent Gray

The horses were changed three times on the 80-mile (130 km) trip, normally completed in 17 hours.

The stagecoach lines in the U.S. were operated by private companies. Their most profitable contracts were with U.S. Mail and were hotly contested. Pony Express, which began operations in 1860, is often called first fast mail service from the Missouri River to the Pacific Coast, but the Overland Mail Company began a twice-weekly mail service from Missouri to San Francisco in September 1858. Transcontinental stage-coaching ended with the completion of the transcontinental railroad in 1869.

=== Australia ===
Cobb & Co was established in Melbourne in 1853 and grew to service Australia's mainland eastern states and South Australia.

=== New Zealand ===
A Cobb & Co (Australia) proprietor arrived in New Zealand on 4 October 1861, thus beginning Cobb & Co (New Zealand) stagecoach operation.

=== Southern Africa ===
The railway network in South Africa was extended from Mafeking through Bechuanaland and reached Bulawayo in 1897. Prior to its arrival, a network of stagecoach routes existed.

=== Ottoman Palestine ===
Stagecoach and other horse-drawn travel to Jerusalem was used in Ottoman Palestine before cars and railways fully displaced it. A travel account from 1891 describes departing from Jaffa and then taking place in a stagecoach traveling toward Jerusalem over difficult roads.

== In popular culture ==
Stories that prominently involve a stagecoach include:

- 1936, Winds of the Wasteland, a Western film about two partners who start a stagecoach line when the arrival of telegraph ends the Pony Express business.
- 1937, Wells Fargo, a Western set around early development of Wells Fargo's mail and transportation business.
- 1939, Stagecoach, a Western film centered on a group of passengers traveling by stagecoach through dangerous territory.
- 1941, Arizona Bound, a Western about threats to a stage line from criminals and sabotage, and the efforts to keep stagecoach service running.
- 1946, Stagecoach to Denver, a Western film focused on a perilous stagecoach journey carrying a young boy who needs medical help.
- 1948, Black Bart, a Western film about the notorious outlaw the outlaw and the crimes associated with stagecoach robberies.
- 1950, A Ticket to Tomahawk, a Western/comedy in which people tied to stagecoach travel fight to protect their livelihood as rail service threatens to take over.
- 1954, Riding Shotgun, a Western about a stagecoach guard who uncovers a plot to ambush and rob a coach.
- 1956, Dakota Incident, a Western film built around passengers traveling by stagecoach who are attacked and forced into a survival ordeal.
- 1957, Gunsight Ridge, a Western film involving investigations into a series of stagecoach robberies.
- 1957, The Tall T, a Western film in which a stagecoach hijacking sets off the central conflict.
- 1959, Westbound, a Western about establishing and protecting an Overland mail stage line during the Civil War.
- 1960–1961, Stagecoach West, a Western television series following a frontier stagecoach line and the dangers faced along its routes.
- 1964, Stage to Thunder Rock, a Western involving tensions around stagecoach travel and the operation of a stage depot.
- 1966, Stagecoach, a Western remake centered on a hazardous stagecoach journey.
- 1967, Hombre, a Western film in which the plot unfolds during a stagecoach trip that turns violent after a robbery.
- 1968, The Stagecoach, a Western comic about escorting a stagecoach across dangerous territory.
- 1983–1985, Five Mile Creek, a Western television series focused on running an Australian stagecoach line and the challenges of frontier transport.
- 1986, Stagecoach, a Western film remake in which the story centers on passengers traveling by stagecoach through hostile country.

== See also ==
- Carriage
- Stage wagon
- Charabanc
- Charley Parkhurst
- Coach (carriage)
- Horse-drawn omnibus
- Horse harness
- Jarbidge Stage Robbery
- Mail robbery
- O.K. Corral
- Riding shotgun
- Stage Coaches Act 1788
- Stage Coaches Act 1790
- Turnpike road
- Wagonette
- Wells Fargo & Co.
- Wickenburg Massacre
