= Stage Coaches Act 1790 =

Act of the Parliament of Great Britain

- Act of Parliament
- Parliament of Great Britain
- Long title: An Act to alter, explain, and amend an Act made in the Twenty-eighth Year of the Reign of His present Majesty, intituled, "An Act for limiting the Number of Persons to be carried on the Outside of Stage Coaches or other Carriages," and for regulating the Conduct of the Drivers and Guards thereof.
- Citation: 30 Geo. 3. c. 36
- Territorial extent: Great Britain

Dates
- Royal assent: 10 June 1790
- Commencement: 29 September 1790 (Note: Section 1.)
- Repealed: 9 June 1810
Other legislation
Amends	Stage Coaches Act 1788
Amended by	Stage Coaches, etc. Act 1806
Repealed by	Stage Coaches, etc. (Great Britain) Act 1810
Relates to	Stage Coaches Act 1788

Status: Repealed

Text of statute as originally enacted

The Stage Coaches Act 1790 (30 Geo. 3. c. 36) was an act of the Parliament of Great Britain to regulate the use of stagecoaches.

The act built upon the provisions of the Stage Coaches Act 1788 (30 Geo. 3. c. 36), reducing the permitted number of passengers, clarifying the type of vehicles to which it applied, and providing a simplified method for collecting the fines. It came into force from 29 September 1790. It stipulated that no more than four people were permitted to ride upon the roof, and no more than one (other than the driver) upon the box, (Note: "Box" is the term for the elevated driver's seat; also box-seat.) of any coach or carriage of three or more horses travelling for hire. Any coach or carriage of less than three horses travelling for hire had the limit set at one on the box and three on the roof, although four on the roof were permitted if the coach did not go more than 25 miles from the Post Office in London. If a coach exceeded these limits, the driver was to pay five shillings per each excess person to the collector of the tolls at each turnpike-gate through which they passed. Letting down or picking up people in order to evade the 5s penalty was punishable by imprisonment of the driver for fourteen days to one month. The Act also required that the name of the proprietor of each stagecoach (except mail coaches) be painted legibly on their side door. A coachman who allowed anyone else to drive his coach without the consent of the passengers, or who overturned the carriage or endangered the passengers or their property via misconduct, was to be fined between forty shillings and four pounds; and a guard who fired off his weapons whilst with the coach, other than in defence, was to be fined twenty shillings.

== Subsequent developments ==
The act was amended and clarified by the Stage Coaches, etc. Act 1806 (46 Geo. 3. c. 136).

The whole act was repealed by section 1 of the Stage Coaches, etc. (Great Britain) Act 1810 (50 Geo. 3. c. 48).
