= Samuel James Hume =

Samuel James Hume (June 14, 1885 – September 1, 1962) was an American dramatic director, producer, art museum director, and book dealer.

Samuel Hume was born in San Francisco, California in 1885, the son of James B. Hume, a famous Wells Fargo detective. He attended Berkeley High School, graduating in 1904, and then the University of California at Berkeley, where he played leading roles in student drama productions and received a bachelor's degree in architecture in 1908.

He then traveled in Europe and studied modern European theater practices with Edward Craig in Florence. Returning to the U.S., he attended Harvard College in 1912-14, where he studied in the playwriting workshop of George Pierce Baker, earned a master's degree, and organized the first exhibition of stagecraft in the U.S. The exhibition was presented in Cambridge, New York, Chicago, Detroit, and Cleveland.

From 1916 to 1918 Hume was director of the newly formed Arts and Crafts Theater in Detroit, Michigan, part of the Little Theatre Movement. He brought Sheldon Cheney, an old friend from Berkeley, to Detroit to launch Theater Arts magazine out of the Arts and Crafts Theater.

In 1918 Hume returned to California to become assistant professor of dramatic literature and art at the University of California where, in addition, he directed the Greek Theatre until 1924. In 1924–1925 he commissioned and produced Lexington, a left-leaning play by Sidney Coe Howard, in Lexington, Massachusetts. He then went to Europe and collaborated with Parisian architect and set designer Walter René Fuerst on the book Twentieth Century Stage Decoration.

In 1927 in Paris he met and married Portia Bell, a fellow Berkeley graduate who was studying sculpture with Antoine Bourdelle. This was a second marriage for both. After returning to Berkeley, the couple hired John Hudson Thomas to design a home in the Berkeley hills modeled after a medieval French cloister. It was named a Berkeley Landmark in 1985 and has been known as Hume Cloister or Hume Castle. Its 30-year owners placed it on the market for $5 million in April 2016.

Samuel Hume was the director of the Berkeley Art Association and its Berkeley Art Museum from 1928 to 1932. At the same time he held the title of Director of Avocational Activities in the State of California Department of Education. In that role, he was quoted as saying that experience of the arts could help reduce juvenile delinquency. From about 1928 to 1936 he served as executive secretary for the California Council on Oriental Relations, advocating for immigration reform.

He established At the Sign of the Palindrome, a rare book business specializing in books on art and theater and also selling art reproductions, first in his home and in a shop in downtown Berkeley in 1949. He coauthored Twentieth Century Stage Decoration (1928) and Theater and School (6 editions, 1932–47).

Portia Bell Hume became a psychiatrist, taught at the University of California, San Francisco and Berkeley, and established psychiatry clinics in both cities.

== Research resources ==
- Guide to the Samuel J. and Portia Bell Hume Papers at The Bancroft Library
- "The Hume Cloister: A Commemorative Brochure Presented by the Berkeley Historical Society," 1999.
- "Exhibition of Stagecraft," Harvard Crimson, October 6, 1914
- Ed Herny, Shelley Rideout and Katie Wadell, Berkeley Bohemia: Artists and Visionaries of the Early 20th Century (Salt Lake City: Gibbs Smith, 2008), pp. 89–94.
