= Augustus M. Heslep =

California pioneer, lawyer and Committee of Vigilance member

Augustus M. Heslep (c. 1806 – August 19, 1885) was an American lawyer, vigilante and journalist active in California during the Gold Rush era. In 1849, he traveled overland to California via the Santa Fe Trail, producing detailed accounts of the journey. After settling in Sacramento, he practiced law and journalism, gaining a reputation for frequent, sometimes violent, public feuds and litigation which earned him the nickname "Hellslip." He became the father-in-law of Harry N. Morse after the future Alameda County sheriff eloped with his daughter.

== Early life ==
Heslep was born around 1806 in Virginia. He married Editha Veirs, with whom he had at least three children: Cassandra, Virginia, and Philander. He trained as a physician and practiced in St. Louis, where his health declined.

== Journey to California (1849) ==
In May 1849, Heslep left St. Louis aboard the steamer Timour, joining the Morgan County and California Rangers of Illinois, a quasi-military company of 42 men captained by his brother Joseph Heslep. He later stated that he was seeking health restoration rather than gold. The company hired James Kirker, a frontiersman and Indian fighter, as guide.

The route followed the Santa Fe Trail through areas affected by cholera, extreme weather, and encounters with Shawnee, Osage, Comanche, Arapaho, and Kiowa peoples. Near Mann's Fort, a standoff with approximately 160 warriors was resolved through a council and the sharing of a peace pipe. Heslep, drawing on his medical training, treated a gunshot wound sustained by companion Joshua Barton during an antelope hunt.

The company reached Santa Fe by August 1849, briefly prospected for gold at Sangre de Cristo creek, then descended the Rio Grande and crossed the desert to the Colorado River. The company lost only one mule to drowning and one to theft, a remarkably low casualty rate. Heslep reached Los Angeles in December 1849 and traveled north through the mission chain to San José.

Heslep sent detailed letters to newspapers back east, recording wood, water, grass, and distances for the benefit of future emigrants. His letters were later published in Ralph P. Bieber's Southern Trails to California in 1849 and are considered an important primary source on the southern overland route. Ironically, the privation and exposure of the journey restored Heslep's health, and he reported feeling more robust than he had in years.

== Early career in California ==
Heslep eventually settled in Sacramento and was considered one of the city's early patriarchs. In the winter of 1850, he stood unsuccessfully for District Judge before the Legislature, then entered a legal partnership with Hardin Bigelow, Sacramento's first mayor, elected in April 1850.

He shifted from medicine to law and journalism, contributing articles to Sacramento and San Francisco papers. Many contemporaries referred to him as "Judge Heslep," although it appears he never held a judicial appointment.

His family joined him in California in 1853. In 1854, Editha moved with the children to San José so they could attend school; Heslep paid for Virginia's education at the College of Notre Dame there. Some time after, Heslep divorced Editha, the legality of which she later contested.

== Murder of Joseph S. Heslep (1855) ==
Despite his combative public persona, Heslep had taken a destitute British seaman named Edward Griffiths, along with Griffiths' wife and daughter, into his San Francisco home. Heslep had been unable to find work for Griffiths in San Francisco, so he sent him with a letter of introduction to his brother Joseph, then Treasurer of Tuolumne County, in Sonora. Joseph befriended Griffiths and tried to help him.

On the night of January 18, 1855, Joseph was found dead in his office. He had been struck eight times in the head with an axe, and paper had been stuffed into his mouth, throat, and nostrils. The office safe had been broken open and approximately $6,000 in county funds taken.

When bloody clothing and the stolen gold were found in Griffiths' hotel room, he confessed to the killing. In his confession, Griffiths stated that he had asked Joseph Heslep for a loan. When refused, he seized a bag of money, and when Heslep struck him, Griffiths attacked him with an axe.

Despite a speech from Sheriff Solomon urging legal process, an armed crowd seized Griffiths and hanged him from a tree on the outskirts of town. Augustus Heslep, grief-stricken, published an open letter in the Daily Alta California warning the public against extending charity to strangers.

== Marriage of Virginia Heslep and Harry Morse (1855) ==
That same year, a young Harry Morse, then working as a butcher, began courting Heslep's daughter Virginia. Heslep, wary of strangers after his brother's murder and viewing the tradesman as beneath his educated daughter, refused Morse's request for her hand. Virginia, however, was eager to leave her unhappy parents who were on the brink of divorce. Morse climbed through a window of the Heslep house at night and physically carried Virginia away. The couple married in Oakland on September 14, 1855, before Heslep could intervene. Morse went on to become the sheriff of Alameda County, and one of the most prominent lawmen in California history. He also maintained a business relationship with Heslep's son Philander; the two opened a flour mill in Hayward that was destroyed in the 1868 Hayward earthquake, causing them a serious financial loss.

== Vigilance Committee and public disputes (1856) ==
When San Francisco's 1856 Vigilance Committee was organized after the murder of newspaper editor James King of William, Augustus Heslep immediately enrolled, signing his name twice on the May 14 roster, one of several enthusiastic "repeat signers."

In June 1856, Sacramento attorney James H. Hardy published a lengthy attack on Heslep in the Daily Democratic State Journal, accusing him of medical and legal quackery, defrauding his Santa Fe Trail companions, mishandling the Bigelow estate, bribing a U.S. District Attorney, and attempting to sexually assault one of his daughters.

Heslep responded in the Sacramento Age, denying the charges and announcing libel suits. Within the week, his ex-wife Editha Heslep published a letter in the State Journal describing his cruelty during her illness, the installation of a young schoolteacher named Josephine Morrow in their household, and a divorce she claimed he obtained fraudulently in her absence. Their daughter Cassandra co-signed the letter.

Days after the letter appeared, the Vigilance Committee expelled Heslep. Editha submitted formal charges against him to the committee, but they were dismissed on August 15. The committee returned her papers on September 16 with a communication that they could not consider them further. A few weeks later, on September 5, 1856, Heslep married Josephine Morrow in Sacramento.

== Journalism and further conflicts (1857–1858) ==
Heslep became editor of the San Francisco Evening Plaindealer. Journalist Caspar T. Hopkins later described Heslep as "an old sore headed, disreputable lawyer" who had promised him $150 per month as assistant editor but never paid him.

During the Vigilance period, Heslep had helped prosecute Edward "Ned" McGowan on a charge of accessory to the King killing. Although McGowan was acquitted, he bore a lasting grudge against Heslep. As editor of the Phoenix, McGowan became a persistent antagonist, referring to Heslep in print as "Dr. Plug," "Hellslip," and "a decayed skunk" while repeating the allegation of sexual assault against his daughter. Heslep filed a libel suit against McGowan in January 1858 but failed to appear when the case was called, causing the charge to be dismissed. McGowan found Heslep shortly after adjournment and physically assaulted him, spitting in his face, punching him, and beating him with his own cane. Heslep, though reportedly armed and called upon by McGowan to draw, did not fight back.

== Weber shooting (1863) ==
Heslep was representing a claimant challenging the boundaries of a land grant held by Captain Charles M. Weber, the founder of Stockton. On the evening of July 18, 1863, Heslep's process server, W. J. Barrett, went to Weber's residence to serve papers and was caned by Weber, suffering nine cuts to the scalp.

Shortly afterward, Heslep approached Weber. According to one account, Heslep raised his cane and suggested Weber "compromise that matter," which Weber interpreted as blackmail. As Heslep turned to leave, Weber drew a derringer and shot him in the back. The ball perforated his left lung and exited through the chest. Heslep ran toward El Dorado Street, exclaiming "Weber has shot me," before collapsing.

Weber surrendered to the Chief of Police the following morning and posted bail. The criminal case was eventually dismissed. Heslep sued Weber for $50,000 in damages, and a jury awarded $30,000. Judge Orville C. Pratt reduced the amount to $15,000, informing Heslep he would grant a new trial unless Heslep accepted. Heslep agreed but later sued Judge Pratt for $20,000 over the reduction.

== Later life and death ==
Heslep continued practicing law in San Francisco for two decades despite chronic ill health and the lingering effects of the Weber shooting. His ex-wife and children had severed ties with him after the divorce; Virginia never forgave him for leaving her mother. He died of heart disease on August 19, 1885, alone in his law office on Kearny Street. He was seventy-eight years old. A long letter addressed to Harry Morse was found on his desk, in which he pleaded with his son-in-law to help him reconcile with his estranged children.

His obituary in the Daily Evening Bulletin acknowledged that "as a sharp critic of men and of affairs he created for himself few friends" but noted that "beneath the bristling outer crust of pessimism and what was sometimes called fault-finding, there were many traits which would have made for him friends if trouble had been taken to discover them."
