= Narrato Ponce =

Narrato Ponce (or Narato Ponce) was a California outlaw from Chile and "one of the most famous gunfighters of his time." Governor Frederick Low placed a $500 bounty on Ponce. Injured after an 1867 gun battle with Sheriff Harry N. Morse in Pleasanton, Ponce escaped. When finally killed near Pinole by Morse, his body was discovered to hold "three pistol wounds and 13 pieces of shotgun lead" from the previous shootout.

At about 2:00 am on October 3, 1867, the onetime notorious Chileno outlaw named Narrato Ponce was engaged in a poker game with several others at Graevenor's Saloon in the town of Hayward California, just east of San Francisco. A dispute arose and Ponce left the room and returned, firing a pistol at his agitators, eventually putting a bullet straight through the lung out of the body and into the arm of his target. The victim was Lewis Joy, who after being shot, rose from the table and fell dead a few steps later in another room. Some accounts claim that before Narrato Ponce made haste and escaped in the dark from the sight of this cold blooded murder, he first walked up to the bar and had the audacity to order a drink, asking if anyone else would want anything, not making it clear if he meant a drink or lead. The slayer then made his way under the cover of darkness, leaving his horse behind him in the corral.

== Capture ==
In 1868 he was killed by the Alameda County sheriff, Harry Morse. Harry Morse learned of Narrato Ponce's shooting and killing of a man, and was soon on the case to apprehend him. Not due to any lack of effort on Morse's behalf, but it wouldn't be until the end of the month before a solid lead came forward as to Narrato Ponce's whereabouts. He was allegedly hiding out in the mountainous regions of Murray township at the back of Livermore Valley. On November 1 an Officer Conway, of Oakland, was granted permission, upon authority of the mayor, to join Sheriff Morse. The two lawmen made their way to Ponce, ditching a buggy in the Amador Valley near Dublin California for the place where they were now informed the murderer was supposed to be concealed. Sheriff Morse came by secret information that Ponce would make his way along a certain by-road at night to try and escape to a lower county, and it was there in the shadow of a hay-stack, by a gate where the two lawmen would wait for their man. At half past nine the men heard horses galloping and the voice Morse recognized as the murderer and a companion. The lawmen previously tied up the gate to prevent the outlaw's escape. Ponce opened the gate and tied it coming within ten feet of Morse, who drew his shotgun and ordered the Chileno to stop. Ponce refused, and quickly turned his horse around to double back but was met by Conway, who had expected him to turn his way. The officer drew his six-shooter and started firing at Ponce; at this time Morse discharged a load of buckshot, striking the murderer in the back. Ponce drew his revolver and fired at Conway twice, missing. The last shot fired by Conway caused Narrato Ponce to fall from his horse, but although he was injured he was still able to move on foot along a fence. By the time Conway ran back to the haystack for his Henry rifle, the fugitive was able to slip away under the cover of darkness. Morse fired three shots and Conway five, his last shot missing. The two men searched until two o’clock in the morning without a trace. In the morning the lawmen enlisted the help of ten Mexicans who helped them search up into the hills, where they discovered the murderer's coat completely riddled with buck-shot and balls. A half mile further they found the Chileno's boots were pulled off and left for some reason, but no Narrato Ponce. It was a week later on November 7 that Morse was informed by letter that Sheriff Classen of Contra Costa County had some information on the fugitive's whereabouts if he made his way to Martinez. Morse quickly made his way, arriving at the rendezvous prepared. The lead stated that Ponce was now in Cisco, Placer County. Without hesitation and the help of Deputy Sheriff Swain of Contra Costa County, the men went for Cisco. They would take a steamboat for Sacramento at Antioch to get their man. When they arrived they leaned that he wasn't there in Cisco, but rather Narrato was holed up in Rigg's Cañon, near Monte Diablo. To reach his hideout the lawmen had to backtrack to San Francisco, where by boat they would go to San Leandro. Undeterred, once there, they would go on saddleback horses for the Black Hills North of Livermore Valley. Once again Morse was accompanied by the brave Officer Conway, and joined by the sheriff of San Leandro, as well as Sheriff Swain to complete the main law party of four. As it had gone before, it just so happened that new information from an old Native American revealed that the elusive Narrato Ponce was hiding behind them back from where they came in the bay of Pinole. They made a rapid return to San Leandro, and from there to San Francisco where they took a boat back to Martinez. They were finally closing in on their man. Pinole was just eleven miles south of Martinez and seven East of San Pablo. Searching every house in the valley they saw a man on a mountain side holding a bundle and carrying a shotgun behind the house of José Rojos that might be their man. While Morse went up to the man on the hill to ascertain who it was Conway and Swain were instructed to go to the house and let no one out. Suddenly, Swain cried out, “He’s here!”, followed by a pistol shot. Morse immediately pulled his horse into a run for the house where he saw Narrato Ponce yet again on the run to escape from the officers shooting after him. While in pursuit of Ponce who was running, Morse came to an abrupt stop due to a ravine that came between himself and the fugitive. Having to dismount Morse yelled out to the murderer to stop, to which the pursued ignored, and kept on running away. At this moment Officer Conway shot through the Ponces’ right hand that was holding his pistol that forced him to switch hands. He kept shooting at his pursuers, making it obvious that he would not be taken alive. Sheriff Morse was faced with no other alternative and concluded the matter. He fired four shots that missed the running assailant when a fifth shot from his Henry Rifle dropped the fugitive face down where he lay dead, fixed in a position with his hand firmly clinching his gun. His body was removed and brought before a coroner's jury that was summoned.
