= Stage Coaches Act 1788 =

Act of the Parliament of Great Britain

- Act of Parliament
- Parliament of Great Britain
- Long title: An Act for limiting the Number of Persons to be carried on the Outside of Stage Coaches or other Carriages.
- Citation: 28 Geo. 3. c. 57
- Territorial extent: Great Britain

Dates
- Royal assent: 25 June 1788
- Commencement: 1 November 1788 (Note: Section 1.)
- Repealed: 9 June 1810
Other legislation
Amended by	Stage Coaches Act 1790; Stage Coaches, etc. Act 1806
Repealed by	Stage Coaches, etc. (Great Britain) Act 1810

Status: Repealed

Text of statute as originally enacted

The Stage Coaches Act 1788 (28 Geo. 3. c. 57) was an act of the Parliament of Great Britain to regulate the use of stagecoaches. It came into force from 1 November 1788.

It stipulated that no more than six people were permitted to ride upon the roof, and no more than two upon the box, of any coach or carriage traveling for hire. The penalty was to be a fine of forty shillings per person over the limit, levied on the driver; if the driver was the owner, they were to be fined four pounds per person. If the driver could not be found, then the owner was liable to the 40s penalty.

== Subsequent developments ==
The act was later amended and clarified by the Stage Coaches Act 1790 (30 Geo. 3. c. 36) and the Stage Coaches, etc. Act 1806 (46 Geo. 3. c. 136).

The whole act was repealed by section 1 of the Stage Coaches, etc. (Great Britain) Act 1810 (50 Geo. 3. c. 48).
