= Wells, Fargo Detective =

Biography novel by James B. Hume

- Front cover of Wells, Fargo Detective>, 1969 edition.
- Author: Richard H. Dillon
- Publication date: 1969
- ISBN: 0-87417-113-X

Wells, Fargo Detective: A Biography of James B. Hume is a biography of the famous Wells Fargo detective, James B. Hume (1827–1904). The book was written by Richard H. Dillon and published in 1969 by Coward–McCann, Inc. of New York.

The biography follows Hume from his birth in New York, life on his family farm in Pretty Prairie, Howe, LaGrange County, Indiana and chronicles his travels to the gold fields of California. It covers his career as a gold miner, and peace officer in El Dorado County, California, and finally, as a detective for Wells, Fargo & Company. Many of his cases are related including the famous case of Black Bart.

== Editions ==
- New York: Coward–McCann, Inc., 1969
- Reno: University of Nevada Press (reprint edition), 1986. ISBN 0-87417-113-X
