= Black Bart (film) =

1948 film by George Sherman

- Belgian film poster
- Directed by: George Sherman
- Written by: William Bowers; Jack Natteford; Luci Ward
- Produced by: Leonard Goldstein
- Starring: Yvonne De Carlo; Dan Duryea; Jeffrey Lynn
- Cinematography: Irving Glassberg
- Edited by: Russell F. Schoengarth
- Music by: Frank Skinner; Leith Stevens
- Production company: Universal Pictures
- Distributed by: Universal-International
- Release dates: February 17, 1948 (San Francisco); March 3, 1948 (New York City)
- Running time: 80 minutes
- Country: United States
- Language: English
- Budget: $1 million

Black Bart is a 1948 American Western Technicolor film directed by George Sherman and starring Yvonne De Carlo, and Dan Duryea as the real-life stagecoach bandit Charles E. Boles, known as Black Bart. The movie was produced by Leonard Goldstein with a screenplay written by Luci Ward, Jack Natteford and William Bowers. The film, also known under the alternate title Black Bart, Highwayman, was released by Universal Pictures on March 3, 1948.

== Plot ==
Old-time outlaw Jersey Brady tells the story of his ex-partner, notorious highwayman Charles E. Boles, also known as Black Bart.

Years earlier, Charles, Lance Hardeen, and Jersey are working as outlaws when Charles decides to leave the gang, move to California, and pull off one last, big heist, which will allow him to go straight. Although Lance tries to trick Charles out of his share of their hidden loot, Charles secretly double-crosses Lance first and steals all the money.

Months later in Sacramento, Charles meets an ex-partner Clark, who now uses his position as a lawyer to commit big crimes. Together, the two plan to destroy the local Wells Fargo bank, create their own bank in its place, and profit from the growing gold rush business. Over the next two months, Clark tips off Charles about all the Wells Fargo money shipments, and a disguised Charles robs each stage until the townspeople lose confidence in the bank.

One day, when a masked Charles, now known as Black Bart, stops a coach transporting Lance, Jersey, and the celebrated dancer Lola Montez, Lance recognizes Charles' voice and helps to save the coach from his thievery. Lance then brings the coach to the bank's relay station, where he further impresses Lola by saving the broken leg of the driver. Soon after, however, Charles, as Black Bart, also intrigues Lola when he sneaks into the station, returns her diamond bracelet, and embraces her before fleeing.

The next day when they reach Sacramento, Wells Fargo manager Mark Lorimer and Sheriff Gordon hire Lance and Jersey, whom they consider their new heroes, as coach guards. Charles, a respected rancher by day, greets them in the local bar, and although Lance reveals that he knows Charles is Black Bart and tells him that he wants Lola, Charles insists they take out Lola together. One day, Charles gets Lola alone and the two fall in love, but after he admits he is Black Bart, she implores him to give up his criminal life to be with her, and he agrees to do so after just one last job.

Meanwhile, Sheriff Gordon devises a plan for Lance to act as lookout for a posse of deputies who are to guard a coach carrying the payload that will save Wells Fargo. As Lance and Jersey scheme to rob the stage themselves and blame it on Black Bart, Clark tells Charles that if the stage gets through, their plan will be ruined. Black Bart meets the stage, orders Jersey to throw the money box down as the stage rides past, and escapes from Lance. When he opens the box, however, he finds it empty and realizes the money must still be at the relay station.

That night, after Charles tells Lola he has to go back to retrieve the money, she convinces him to not take the risk. Charles then tells Lance that he can steal and keep all the money himself. Lance, however, forces Charles to go with him to the relay station, and as soon as they get there, they are ambushed by a waiting posse. They escape into a barn, but when the posse sets it on fire, they are forced to run out and both of them are shot.

Making a final statement about not knowing what happened to Lola after the incident and that Charles's death convinced him to go straight, Jersey wraps up his story from his current home, a jail cell.

== Cast ==
- Yvonne De Carlo as Lola Montez
- Dan Duryea as Charles E. Boles AKA Black Bart
- Jeffrey Lynn as Lance Hardeen
- Percy Kilbride as Jersey Brady
- Lloyd Gough as Sheriff Gordon
- Frank Lovejoy as Mark Lorimer
- John McIntire as Clark
- Don Beddoe as J.T. Hall
- Ray Walker as MacFarland
- Soledad Jiménez as Teresa
- Eddy C. Waller as Ed Mason
- Anne O'Neal as Mrs. Harmon
- Chief Many Treaties as Indian
- Eddie Acuff as Elkins
- Earl Audet as Townsman
- William Bailey as Townsman
- Ray Bennett as Henry
- Nina Campana as Mamacita
- Tom Coleman as Wells Fargo Representative
- Russ Conway as Wells Fargo Agent Clayton
- Bert Davidson as Blake
- George Douglas as Alcott
- Franklyn Farnum as Al
- Douglas Fowley as Sheriff Mix
- Ray Harper as Townsman
- Reed Howes as Bartender
- Si Jenks as Tobacco-Chewing Barfly
- Jack Kenny as Townsman
- Milton Kibbee as Townsman
- Kenneth Ross MacKenzie as Townsman
- Paul Maxey as Townsman
- Frank O'Connor as Wells Fargo Executive
- William O'Leary as Wells Fargo Man
- Artie Ortego as Townsman
- Marshall Ruth as Bandleader
- Everett Shields as Keller
- George Sowards as Stage Driver
- Ray Teal as Pete
- Harry Tenbrook as Barfly
- Jack Tornek as Townsman
- Wayne C. Treadway as Townsman
- Henry Wills as Ambush Deputy

== Production ==
The script is a highly fictionalized portrayal of real-life highwayman, Charles E. Boles, also known as Black Bart, who robbed several stagecoaches in Northern California and Southern Oregon between 1875 and 1883. Universal announced the film in June, 1946 and that Charles Korvin might be cast and the film would be titled Black Bart – Highwayman.

When Universal merged with International Pictures, the film was temporarily shelved, but was revived in January, 1947 under the title The Adventures of Black Bart. Luci Ward and Jack Natteford, who had written Badman's Territory, were assigned to write the script. Paul Malvern was initially named producer for the film but Leonard Goldstein eventually got the job, his first as a producer. George Sherma was assigned to direct.

In April, 1947, Universal announced the lead roles were to be played by Yvonne De Carlo, Dan Duryea, and Edmond O'Brien; O'Brien soon dropped out to appear in A Double Life and was replaced by Jeffrey Lynn who had just completed his long career at Warner Bros.

Portions of the movie were filmed in Utah at Kanab Canyon, Strawberry Valley, and Strawberry Point.

== Reception ==
The film was popular at the box office.

== Home media ==
The film is available on DVD in Europe, presented in PAL format where the film is sped-up slightly to fit this different format and has a runtime of 77 minutes. Most DVD-Rs of the movie made for North American purchasers use the same print from the PAL DVDs.
