= List of acts of the 1st session of the 2nd Parliament of the United Kingdom =

This is a complete list of acts of the 1st session of the 2nd Parliament of the United Kingdom which had regnal year 43 Geo. 3. This session met from 16 November 1802 until 12 August 1803.

== 1802 ==
The first session of the 2nd Parliament of the United Kingdom, which met from 16 November 1802 until 12 August 1803.

This session was also traditionally cited as 43 G. 3.

=== Public general acts ===
Short title	Citation	Royal assent
Long title
Negotiations of Notes and Bills Act 1802 (repealed)	43 Geo. 3. c. 1	17 December 1802
An act for further suspending, until the Expiration of six Weeks after the Commencement of the next Session of Parliament, the Operation of two Acts, made in the fifteenth (Note: Negotiations of Notes and Bills Act 1775 (15 Geo. 3. c. 51)) and seventeenth (Note: Bills of Exchange Act 1776 (17 Geo. 3. c. 30)) Years of the Reign of his present Majesty, for restraining the Negotiation of Promissory Notes and Bills of Exchange, under a limited Sum, within that Part of Great Britain called England. (Repealed by Statute Law Revision Act 1872 (35 & 36 Vict. c. 63))
Militia (Ireland) Act 1802 (repealed)	43 Geo. 3. c. 2	17 December 1802
An Act for the more speedy and effectual Enrolment of the Militia of Ireland; and for filling up Vacancies therein. (Repealed by Statute Law Revision Act 1861 (24 & 25 Vict. c. 101))
Duties on Malt, etc. Act 1802 (repealed)	43 Geo. 3. c. 3	17 December 1802
An act for continuing and granting to his Majesty certain Duties upon Malt, Mum, Cyder, and Perry, for the Service of the Year One thousand eight hundred and three. (Repealed by Statute Law Revision Act 1872 (35 & 36 Vict. c. 63))
Duties on Pensions, etc. Act 1802 (repealed)	43 Geo. 3. c. 4	17 December 1802
An act for continuing and granting to his Majesty a Duty on Pensions, Offices, and Personal Estates in England, Wales, and the Town of Berwick-upon-Tweed; and certain Duties on Sugar, Malt, Tobacco, and Snuff, for the Service of the Year One thousand eight hundred and three. (Repealed by Statute Law Revision Act 1872 (35 & 36 Vict. c. 63))
Loans or Exchequer Bills (No. 5) Act 1802 (repealed)	43 Geo. 3. c. 5	17 December 1802
An act for raising the Sum of five Millions by Loans or Exchequer Bills, or the Credit of such Aids or Supplies as have been or shall be granted by Parliament for the Service of Great Britain, for the Year One thousand eight hundred and three. (Repealed by Statute Law Revision Act 1872 (35 & 36 Vict. c. 63))
Indemnity (No. 2) Act 1802 (repealed)	43 Geo. 3. c. 6	17 December 1802
An act to indemnify such Persons as have omitted to qualify themselves for Offices and Employments; and to indemnify Justices of the Peace, or others, who have omitted to register or deliver in their Qualifications within the Time directed by Law, and for extending the Time limited for those Purposes, until the twenty-fifth Day of December One thousand eight hundred and three; to indemnify Members and Officers, in Cities, Corporations, and Borough Towns, whose Admissions have been omitted to be stamped according to Law, or having been stamped, have been lost or mislaid, and for allowing them, until the twenty-fifth Day of December One thousand eight hundred and three, to provide Admissions duly stamped; and to permit such Persons as have omitted to make and file Affidavits of the Execution of Indentures of Clerks to Attornies and Solicitors, to make and file the same on or before the first Day of Michaelmas Term One thousand eight hundred and three. (Repealed by Promissory Oaths Act 1871 (34 & 35 Vict. c. 48))
Navy, Victualling and Transport Bills Act 1802 (repealed)	43 Geo. 3. c. 7	29 December 1802
An act to amend an Act made in the thirty-seventh Year of the Reign of his present Majesty, intituled, "An act to provide for the more speedy Payment of all Navy, Victualling, and Transport Bills that shall be issued in future." (Note: Navy Victualling and Transport Bills Act 1796 (37 Geo. 3. c. 26)) (Repealed by Statute Law Revision Act 1861 (24 & 25 Vict. c. 101))
Baking Trade, Dublin Act 1802 (repealed)	43 Geo. 3. c. 8	29 December 1802
An act for reviving and continuing for five Years from the passing thereof, and from thence to the End of the then next Session of Parliament, certain Acts, passed in the Parliament of Ireland, for regulating the Baking Trade in the City and County of Dublin; and for indemnifying all Persons who have acted in pursuance of any of the Provisions of the said Acts, or any of them. (Repealed by Statute Law Revision Act 1872 (35 & 36 Vict. c. 63))
Militia Pay (Ireland) Act 1802 (repealed)	43 Geo. 3. c. 9	29 December 1802
An act to rectify a Mistake in an Act made in the forty-second Year of the Reign of his present Majesty, intituled, "An act for defraying the Charge of the Pay of the Militia of Ireland, until the twenty fifth Day of March One thousand eight hundred and three; and for holding Courts Martial on Serjeant Majors, Serjeants, Corporals, and Drummers for Offences committed during the Time such Militia shall not be embodied," (Note: Militia (Ireland) (No. 2) Act 1802 (42 Geo. 3. c. 118)) relative to the Pay of Serjeants, Corporals, and Drummers. (Repealed by Statute Law Revision Act 1872 (35 & 36 Vict. c. 63))
Militia (Exemption of Religious Teachers) Act 1802 (repealed)	43 Geo. 3. c. 10	29 December 1802
An act to amend so much of an Act, made in the forty-second Year of the Reign of his present Majesty, intituled, "An act for amending the Laws relating to the Militia in England, and for augmenting the Militia," (Note: Militia Act 1802 (42 Geo. 3. c. 90)) as relates to the Exemption of licensed Teachers of any separate Congregation from serving in the Militia. (Repealed by Territorial Army and Militia Act 1921 (11 & 12 Geo. 5. c. 37))
Drawbacks and Bounties Act 1802 (repealed)	43 Geo. 3. c. 11	29 December 1802
An act for discontinuing certain Drawbacks and Bounties on the Exportation of Sugar from Great Britain, and for allowing other Drawbacks and Bounties in lieu thereof, until the fifteenth Day of January One, thousand eight hundred and four. (Repealed by Statute Law Revision Act 1872 (35 & 36 Vict. c. 63))
Exportations, etc. Act 1802 (repealed)	43 Geo. 3. c. 12	29 December 1802
An act to continue, until the first Day of January One thousand eight hundred and four, several Laws relating to the prohibiting the Exportation and permitting the Importation of Corn, and for allowing the Importation of other Articles of Provision without Payment of Duty; to the Relief of Captors of Prizes, with respect to the bringing and landing certain Prize Goods in this Kingdom; and to the regulating the Trade and Commerce to and from the Isle of Malta. (Repealed by Statute Law Revision Act 1872 (35 & 36 Vict. c. 63))
Exportations, etc. (No. 2) Act 1802 (repealed)	43 Geo. 3. c. 13	29 December 1802
An act to continue, until the first Day of January One thousand eight hundred and four, so much of an Act, made in the forty-first Year of the Reign of his present Majesty, (Note: Exportation, etc. Act 1801 (41 Geo. 3. (U.K.) c. 36)) as relates to the prohibiting the Exportation from Ireland of Corn or Potatoes, or other Provisions; and for permitting the Importation into Ireland of Corn, Fish, and Provisions, without Payment of Duty. (Repealed by Statute Law Revision Act 1872 (35 & 36 Vict. c. 63))
Trade Between Great Britain and Ireland Act 1802 (repealed)	43 Geo. 3. c. 14	29 December 1802
An act for continuing, until the first Day of July One thousand eight hundred and three, an Act, made in the forty-second Year of the Reign of his present Majesty, intituled, "An act for regulating, until the fifteenth Day of February One thousand eight hundred and three, the Prices at which Grain, Meal, and Flour may be exported from Great Britain to Ireland, and from Ireland to Great Britain;" (Note: Trade Between Great Britain and Ireland Act 1802 (43 Geo. 3. c. 14)) and for permitting, from and after the passing thereof, until the said first Day of July One thousand eight hundred and three, the Exportation of Seed Corn from Great Britain to Ireland, and the Importation of Malt into Great Britain from Ireland. (Repealed by Statute Law Revision Act 1872 (35 & 36 Vict. c. 63))
Transportation (No. 2) Act 1802 (repealed)	43 Geo. 3. c. 15	29 December 1802
An act to facilitate, and render more easy the Transportation of Offenders. (Repealed by Transportation Act 1824 (5 Geo. 4. c. 84))
Inquiry into Certain Frauds and Abuses Act 1802 (repealed)	43 Geo. 3. c. 16	29 December 1802
An act for appointing Commissioners to enquire and examine into any Irregularities, Frauds, or Abuses which are or have been practised by Persons employed in the several Naval Departments therein mentioned, and in the Business of Prize Agency; and to report such Observations as shall occur to them for preventing such Irregularities, Frauds, and Abuses; and for the better, conducting and managing the Business of the said Departments, and of Prize Agency, in future. (Repealed by Statute Law Revision Act 1872 (35 & 36 Vict. c. 63))
Drawbacks (No. 2) Act 1802 (repealed)	43 Geo. 3. c. 17	29 December 1802
An act for discontinuing certain Drawbacks and Bounties on the Exportation of Sugar from Ireland, and for allowing, until the fifteenth Day of January One thousand eight hundred and four, other Drawbacks and Bounties instead thereof. (Repealed by Statute Law Revision Act 1872 (35 & 36 Vict. c. 63))

=== Local acts ===
Short title	Citation	Royal assent
Long title
Span Smithy and Talke Road Act 1802 (repealed)	43 Geo. 3. c. i	17 December 1802
An Act for continuing the Term, and altering and enlarging the Powers of an Act, passed in the Twenty-eighth Year of the Reign of His present Majesty, intituled, "An Act for amending, widening, and keeping in Repair, the Road from Spann Smithy in the County of Chester, to Talk in the County of Stafford." (Note: Chester and Stafford Roads Act 1788 (28 Geo. 3. c. 104)) (Repealed by Span Smithy and Talke Road Act 1824 (5 Geo. 4. c. xxv))
Thirsk and Yarm Road Act 1802 (repealed)	43 Geo. 3. c. ii	17 December 1802
An Act for repairing, improving, and maintaining the Road leading from Thirsk to Yarm, in the County of York. (Repealed by Thirsk and Yarm Road Act 1824 (5 Geo. 4. c. vi))
Manchester District of Road Act 1802	43 Geo. 3. c. iii	29 December 1802
An Act for continuing the Term, and altering and enlarging the Powers of an Act, passed in the Thirty-eighth Year of the Reign of His present Majesty, intituled, "An Act for more effectually repairing, widening, altering, and improving the Road from the Town of Manchester, by a Place called The White Smithy, (Note: The White Smithy was located at the junction of the A665 Bury Old Road and the A576 Middleton Road in Crumpsall. 53°30′57″N 2°14′58″W) in the Township of Crumpsall, to the Town of Rochdale; and also the Road from the said Place called The White Smithy, by a place called Besses of the Barn, to the Town of Bury; and also the Road from the said Place called Besses of the Barn, to Radcliffe Bridge; and also the Lane called Sheepfoot-Lane, in the Township of Prestwich, all in the County Palatine of Lancaster;" (Note: Lancashire Roads Act 1798 (38 Geo. 3. c. xi)) so far as the same relates to a certain District of Road therein described, called The Manchester District.

=== Private acts ===
Short title	Citation	Royal assent
Long title
Widmerpool Inclosure Act 1802	43 Geo. 3. c. 1 Pr.	29 December 1802
An Act for dividing allotting and inclosing the Open Fields, Meadows, Pastures, Commonable, and Waste Lands, in the Parish of Widmerpool, in the County of Nottingham.
Olney Inclosure Act 1802	43 Geo. 3. c. 2 Pr.	29 December 1802
An Act for dividing allotting and inclosing two certain Pieces or Parcels of Land or Ground called or known by the several Names of The Pasture and Dogget's Furze, situate in the Parish of Olney, in the County of Buckingham.
Godmanchester Inclosure Act 1802	43 Geo. 3. c. 3 Pr.	29 December 1802
An Act for dividing and inclosing certain Open and Common Fields, Meadows, Lands, Commons, and Commonable Places, within the Parish of Gumecester otherwise Godmanchester, in the County of Huntingdon.
Plantamour's Naturalization Act 1802	43 Geo. 3. c. 4 Pr.	29 December 1802
An Act for naturalizing Francis Theodore Plantamour.
Bellock's Naturalization Act 1802	43 Geo. 3. c. 5 Pr.	29 December 1802
An Act for naturalizing Charles Bellock.
Hosch's Naturalization Act 1802	43 Geo. 3. c. 6 Pr.	29 December 1802
An Act for naturalizing Isaac Hosch.

=== Sources ===
- Pickering, Danby, ed. (1804). The Statutes at Large. Vol. 44, Part 1. 43 George III. 1802-3. Cambridge: Cambridge University Press – via HathiTrust.
- "43° George III.". The Statutes of the United Kingdom of Great Britain and Ireland. Vol. The First. From A.D. 1801, 41 George III.—To AD 1803, 43 George III. London: Eyre and Strahan. 1804. pp. 657–1239 – via Google Books.
- "43° George III.". The Statutes of the United Kingdom of Great Britain and Ireland. Vol. The First. From A.D. 1801, 41 George III.—To AD 1803, 43 George III. London: Eyre and Strahan. 1804. pp. 657–1239 – via HathiTrust.
- Journal of the House of Commons. Vol. 58. London: His Majesty's Stationery Office. pp. 7–694 – via Google Books.
- Chronological Table of and Index to the Statutes. Vol. 1: To the End of the Session 59 Vict. Sess. 2 (1895) (13th ed.). London: Her Majesty's Stationery Office. 1896. pp. 174–178 – via Google Books.
- "Statutes of the United Kingdom of Great Britain and Ireland, 1803". Irish Statute Book. Office of the Attorney General, Government of Ireland.

== 1803 ==
Continuing the first session of the 2nd Parliament of the United Kingdom, which met from 22 November 1803 until 31 July 1804.

This session was also traditionally cited as 43 G. 3.

=== Public general acts ===
Short title	Citation	Royal assent
Long title
Restrictions on Cash Payments Act 1803 (repealed)	43 Geo. 3. c. 18	28 February 1803
An act to amend and continue, until the Expiration of six Weeks after the Commencement of the next Session of Parliament, the Restrictions contained in several Acts of the thirty-seventh (Note: Restriction on Cash Payments Act 1797 (37 Geo. 3. c. 45)) (Note: Restrictions on Cash Payments Act 1797 (37 Geo. 3. c. 91)) and thirty-eighth (Note: Restriction on Cash Payments (No. 2) Act 1797 (38 Geo. 3. c. 1)) Years of the Reign of his present Majesty, on Payments of Cash by the Bank. (Repealed by Resumption of Cash Payments, etc. Act 1819 (59 Geo. 3. c. 49))
Militia Act (No. 1) 1803 (repealed)	43 Geo. 3. c. 19	24 March 1803
An act to authorize the training and exercising the Militia of Great Britain for twenty-eight Days. (Repealed by Statute Law Revision Act 1861 (24 & 25 Vict. c. 101))
Mutiny Act 1803 (repealed)	43 Geo. 3. c. 20	24 March 1803
An act for punishing Mutiny and Desertion; and for the better Payment of the Army and their Quarters. (Repealed by Statute Law Revision Act 1872 (35 & 36 Vict. c. 63))
Stamps Act 1803 (repealed)	43 Geo. 3. c. 21	24 March 1803
An act for granting to his Majesty several Duties therein mentioned, to be levied by the Commissioners for managing the Stamp Duties in Ireland. (Repealed by Stamps (Ireland) Act 1812 (52 Geo. 3. c. 126))
Hat Duties Act 1803 (repealed)	43 Geo. 3. c. 22	24 March 1803
An act for granting to his Majesty certain Duties on Licences to Persons selling Hats, and on Hats sold by Retail, in Ireland. (Repealed by Duties on Hats, etc., Repeal (Ireland) Act 1811 (51 Geo. 3. c. 60))
Duties on Game Certificates Act 1803 (repealed)	43 Geo. 3. c. 23	24 March 1803
An act for granting to his Majesty certain Duties upon Certificates with respect to the killing of Game in Ireland. (Repealed by Stamps (Ireland) Act 1812 (52 Geo. 3. c. 126))
Duties Continuance Act 1803 (repealed)	43 Geo. 3. c. 24	24 March 1803
An act for continuing, until the twenty-fifth Day of March One thousand eight hundred and four, several Acts for granting and continuing Duties to his Majesty in Ireland. (Repealed by Statute Law Revision Act 1872 (35 & 36 Vict. c. 63))
Parliamentary Elections (Ireland) Act 1803 (repealed)	43 Geo. 3. c. 25	24 March 1803
An act for better securing the Freedom of Elections of Members to serve in Parliament for any Place in Ireland, by disabling certain Officers employed in the Collection or Management of his Majesty's Revenues in Ireland from giving their Votes at such Elections. (Repealed by Revenue Officers' Disabilities Act 1868 (31 & 32 Vict. c. 73))
Annuity to Prince of Wales, etc. Act 1803 (repealed)	43 Geo. 3. c. 26	24 March 1803
An act for enabling his Majesty to settle an Annuity on his Royal Highness the Prince of Wales, (Note: George Augustus Frederick, Prince of Wales; who became George IV in 1820.) to continue until the fifth Day of July One thousand eight hundred and six; and for repealing so much of an Act made in the thirty-fifth Year of the Reign of his Majesty, (Note: Prince of Wales Act 1795 (35 Geo. 3. c. 129)) as directs the annual Payment of thirteen thousand rounds out of the Revenues of the Dutchy of Cornwall to the Commissioners appointed by the said Act. (Repealed by Statute Law Revision Act 1872 (35 & 36 Vict. c. 63))
Marine Mutiny Act 1803 (repealed)	43 Geo. 3. c. 27	24 March 1803
An act for the Regulation of his Majesty's Royal Marine Forces while on Shore. (Repealed by Statute Law Revision Act 1872 (35 & 36 Vict. c. 63))
Postage Act 1803 (repealed)	43 Geo. 3. c. 28	25 March 1803
An act for granting to his Majesty certain Rates and Duties upon Letters and Packets lent by the Post within Ireland. (Repealed by Post Office (Repeal of Laws) Act 1837 (7 Will. 4 & 1 Vict. c. 32))
Continuance of Laws Act 1803 (repealed)	43 Geo. 3. c. 29	25 March 1803
An Act to revive and continue, until the first Day of March One thousand eight hundred and six, an Act, made in the thirty-third Year of the Reign of his present Majesty, (Note: Courts (Newfoundland) Act 1793 (33 Geo. 3. c. 76)) for establishing Courts of Judicature in the Island of Newfoundland; to continue several Laws relating to the preventing the clandestine Running of uncustomed Goods, and for preventing Frauds relating tom the Customs, to the twenty-ninth Day of September One thousand eight hundred and nine, and from thence to the End of the then next Session of Parliament; to the suspending certain countervailing Duties granted by an Act for carrying into Execution the Treaty with America, to the twenty-fifth Day of March One thousand eight hundred and four; to the allowing the Use of Salt, Duty-free, in the preserving of Fish, in Bulk or in Barrels, and to the discontinuing the Bounty payable on White Herrings exported, to the twenty-fifth Day of March One thousand eight hundred and four; to the Encouragement of the Trade and Manufactures of the Isle of Man, to the improving the Revenue thereof, and the more effectual Prevention of Smuggling to and from the said Island, to the fifth Day of July One thousand eight hundred and four; to the more effectual Encouragement of the Manufactures of Flax and Cotton in Great Britain, to the twenty-fourth Day of June One thousand eight hundred and six; to the importing Salt from Europe into the Province of Quebec, in America, to the twenty-fourth Day of June One thousand eight hundred and eight, and from thence to the End of the then next Session of Parliament; to the free Importation of Cochineal and Indigo, to the twenty-ninth Day of September One thousand eight hundred and five, and from thence to the End of the then next Session of Parliament; to the preventing the clandestine Running of Goods, and the Danger of Infection thereby, to the twenty-ninth Day of September One thousand eight hundred and nine, and from thence to the End of the then next Session of Parliament; to the Encouragement of the Silk Manufactures, to the twenty-fourth Day of June One thousand eight hundred and eight, and from thence to the End of the then next Session of Parliament; to the Duties on Spirits made in Scotland, and imported into England, to the first Day of December One thousand eight hundred and nine, and from thence to the End of the then next Session of Parliament; and to the encouraging the Growth of Coffee in his Majesty's Plantations in America, to the twenty-fourth Day of June One thousand eight hundred and nine, and from thence to the End of the then next Session of Parliament. (Repealed by Sea Fisheries Act 1868 (31 & 32 Vict. c. 45))
Roman Catholic Relief Act 1803 (repealed)	43 Geo. 3. c. 30	7 April 1803
An act to entitle Roman Catholicks taking and subscribing the Declaration and Oath contained in the Act of the thirty-first Year of the Reign of his present Majesty, intituled, "An act to relive, upon Conditions and under Restrictions, the Persons therein described from certain Penalties and Disabilities to which Papists, or Persons professing the Popish Religion, are by Law subject," (Note: Roman Catholic Relief Act 1791 (31 Geo. 3. c. 32)) to the Benefits given by an Act of the eighteenth Year of the Reign of his present Majesty, (Note: Papists Act 1778 (18 Geo. 3. c. 60)) intituled, 'An act for relieving his Majesty's Subjects professing the Popish Religion, from certain Penalties and Disabilities imposed on them by an Act, made in the eleventh and twelfth Years of the Reign of King William the Third, intituled, "An act for the further preventing the Growth of Popery.'" (Note: Popery Act 1698 (11 Will. 3. c. 4)) (Repealed by Promissory Oaths Act 1871 (34 & 35 Vict. c. 48))
Woods and Forests Act 1803 (repealed)	43 Geo. 3. c. 31	7 April 1803
An act for establishing certain Regulations in the Office of Surveyor General of his Majesty's Woods, Forests, Parks, and Chases. (Repealed by Woods and Forests Act 1806 (46 Geo. 3. c. 142))
Greenland Whale Fishery Act 1803 (repealed)	43 Geo. 3. c. 32	7 April 1803
An act for allowing Vessels employed in the Greenland Whale Fishery, to complete their full Number of Men at certain Ports for the present Season. (Repealed by Statute Law Revision Act 1872 (35 & 36 Vict. c. 63))
Militia (Ireland) Act 1803 (repealed)	43 Geo. 3. c. 33	7 April 1803
An act to repeal certain Parts of an Act passed in the present Session of Parliament, intituled, "An act for the more speedy and effectual Enrolment of the Militia of Ireland; and for filling up Vacancies therein," (Note: Militia (Ireland) Act 1802 (43 Geo. 3. c. 2)) and for making other Provisions in lieu thereof. (Repealed by Statute Law Revision Act 1861 (24 & 25 Vict. c. 101))
Actions Against Certain Spiritual Persons Act 1803 (repealed)	43 Geo. 3. c. 34	7 April 1803
An act to continue, until the eighth Day of July One thousand eight hundred and three, an Act made in the forty-second Year of the Reign of his present Majesty, (Note: Proceedings Against Spiritual Persons Act 1802 (42 Geo. 3. c. 30)) intituled, "An act to continue, until the eighth Day of April One thousand eight hundred and three, an Act, passed in the last Session of Parliament, (Note: Pluralities of Livings Act 1801 (41 Geo. 3. (U.K.) c. 102)) for staying Proceedings in Actions under the Statute of King Henry the Eighth, (Note: Clergy Act 1529 (21 Hen. 8. c. 13)) for abridging Spiritual Persons from having Pluralities of Livings, and of taking of Farms; and also to stay Proceedings in Actions under the Act of the thirteenth Year of Queen Elizabeth, (Note: Benefices Act 1571 (13 Eliz. 1. c. 20)) touching Leases of Benefices, and other Ecclesiastical Livings, with Cure. (Repealed by Statute Law Revision Act 1872 (35 & 36 Vict. c. 63))
Lands for Ordnance Services, Woolwich Act 1803	43 Geo. 3. c. 35	7 April 1803
An act for vesting certain Lands and Hereditaments in Trustees, for further promoting the Service of his Majesty's Ordnance at Woolwich.
Loans or Exchequer Bills Act 1803 (repealed)	43 Geo. 3. c. 36	22 April 1803
An act for raising the Sum of four Millions by Loans or Exchequer Bills, for the Service of the Year One thousand eight hundred and three. (Repealed by Statute Law Revision Act 1872 (35 & 36 Vict. c. 63))
Annuity to Admiral Saumarez Act 1803 (repealed)	43 Geo. 3. c. 37	22 April 1803
An act to enable his Majesty to grant a certain Annuity to Rear Admiral Sir James Saumarez Baronet, and Knight of the most Honourable Order of the Bath, in Consideration of his eminent Services which he has performed on various Occasions. (Repealed by Statute Law Revision Act 1872 (35 & 36 Vict. c. 63))
Militia (Great Britain) Act 1803 (repealed)	43 Geo. 3. c. 38	22 April 1803
An act to provide, until the twenty-fifth Day of March One thousand eight hundred and four, for the more speedy and effectual Completion of the Establishment of Officers in the Militia of Great Britain; and for facilitating the filling up Vacancies therein. (Repealed by Statute Law Revision Act 1872 (35 & 36 Vict. c. 63))
Distribution of Certain Monies Act 1803 (repealed)	43 Geo. 3. c. 39	22 April 1803
An act for appointing Commissioners for distributing the Money stipulated to be paid by the United States of America, under the Convention made between his Majesty and the said United States, among the Persons having Claims to Compensation out of such Money. (Repealed by Statute Law Revision Act 1872 (35 & 36 Vict. c. 63))
Grenada and Saint Vincent Traders Act 1803 (repealed)	43 Geo. 3. c. 40	17 May 1803
An act for enlarging the Period for the Payment of Part of certain Sums of Money advanced by way of Loan to several Persons connected with and trading to the Islands of Grenada and Saint Vincent. (Repealed by Statute Law Revision Act 1872 (35 & 36 Vict. c. 63))
Quartering of Soldiers Act 1803 (repealed)	43 Geo. 3. c. 41	17 May 1803
An act for increasing the Rates of Subsistence to be paid to Innkeepers and others on quartering Soldiers. (Repealed by Statute Law Revision Act 1872 (35 & 36 Vict. c. 63))
Duties, etc., on Sugar, etc. Act 1803 (repealed)	43 Geo. 3. c. 42	17 May 1803
An act to continue, until the twenty-fifth Day of March One thousand eight hundred and four, so much of an Act made in the forty-first Year of the Reign of his present Majesty, (Note: Taxation (No. 8) Act 1801 (41 Geo. 3. (U.K.) c. 44)) relating to certain Duties on Sugar and Coffee exported; for permitting British Plantation Sugar to be warehoused; and for regulating and allowing Drawbacks on Sugar exported, as relates to repealing the Duties on Sugar and Coffee exported, and allowing British Plantation Sugar to be warehoused. (Repealed by Statute Law Revision Act 1872 (35 & 36 Vict. c. 63))
Collection of Revenue (Ireland) Act 1803 (repealed)	43 Geo. 3. c. 43	17 May 1803
An act to continue, until the twenty-ninth Day of September One thousand eight hundred and four, several Acts of Parliament for the better Collection and Security of his Majesty's Revenue in Ireland; and for preventing Frauds therein. (Repealed by Statute Law Revision Act 1872 (35 & 36 Vict. c. 63))
Restrictions on Cash Payments (Ireland) Act 1803 (repealed)	43 Geo. 3. c. 44	17 May 1803
An act to amend and continue (until three Months after any Restriction imposed by any Act of the present Session of Parliament on the Bank of England from issuing Cash in Payments shall cease), an Act made in the Parliament of Ireland in the thirty-seventh Year of the Reign of his present Majesty, (Note: Restriction on Cash Payments (Ireland) Act 1797 (37 Geo. 3. c. 51 (I))) for confirming and continuing the Restrictions on Payments in Cash by the Bank of Ireland. (Repealed by Statute Law Revision Act 1872 (35 & 36 Vict. c. 63))
Justices of the Peace, Nottingham Act 1803 (repealed)	43 Geo. 3. c. 45	17 May 1803
An act for the more effectually preserving the Peace, and securing the Freedom of Election in the Town of Nottingham, and County of the said Town. (Repealed by Nottingham Improvement Act 1874 (37 & 38 Vict. c. cxciv))
Costs Act 1803 (repealed)	43 Geo. 3. c. 46	27 May 1803
An act for the more effectual Prevention of frivolous and vexatious Arrests and Suits; and to authorize the levying of Poundage upon Executions in certain Cases. (Repealed by Statute Law Revision Act 1890 (53 & 54 Vict. c. 33))
Relief of Families of Militiamen Act 1803 (repealed)	43 Geo. 3. c. 47	27 May 1803
An act for consolidating and amending the several Laws for providing Relief for the Families of Militia Men of England, when called out into actual Service. (Repealed by Militia (Voluntary Enlistment) Act 1875 (38 & 39 Vict. c. 69))
East India Company Act 1803 (repealed)	43 Geo. 3. c. 48	27 May 1803
An act to enable the East India Company to defray the Expences of certain Volunteer Corps raised by the said Company. (Repealed by Statute Law Revision Act 1861 (24 & 25 Vict. c. 101))
Exportation Act 1803 (repealed)	43 Geo. 3. c. 49	27 May 1803
An act to amend so much of several Acts, passed in the sixth and seventh Year, (Note: Coin Act 1694 (6 & 7 Will. 3. c. 17)) and in the seventh and eighth Year (Note: Coinage Act 1695 (7 & 8 Will. 3. c. 19)) of the Reign of King William the Third, as relates to the Exportation of Silver Bullion. (Repealed by Statute Law Revision Act 1872 (35 & 36 Vict. c. 63))
Militia Act 1803 (repealed)	43 Geo. 3. c. 50	11 June 1803
An act for more speedily completing the Militia of Great Britain, raised under two Acts, passed in the forty-second Year of the Reign of his present Majesty; (Note: Militia Act 1802 (42 Geo. 3. c. 90)) (Note: Militia (Scotland) Act 1802 (42 Geo. 3. c. 91)) and for amending the said Acts. (Repealed by Territorial Army and Militia Act 1921 (11 & 12 Geo. 5. c. 37))
Land Tax Redemption Act 1803	43 Geo. 3. c. 51	11 June 1803
An act to render more effectual an Act, passed in the forty-second Year of his present Majesty's Reign, (Note: Land Tax Redemption Act 1802 (42 Geo. 3. c. 116)) for consolidating the Provisions of the several Acts passed for the Redemption and Sale of the Land Tax.
Exportation of Gunpowder Act 1803 (repealed)	43 Geo. 3. c. 52	11 June 1803
An act for indemnifying all Persons who have been concerned in issuing or carrying into Execution certain Orders of Council for the Prevention of the Exportation of Gunpowder, Saltpetre, and Naval Stores, and the Permission of the Exportation of Seed Corn to Norway. (Repealed by Statute Law Revision Act 1872 (35 & 36 Vict. c. 63))
Process (Ireland) Act 1803 (repealed)	43 Geo. 3. c. 53	11 June 1803
An act to render the Process of his Majesty's Courts of King's Bench, Common Pleas, and Exchequer, in Personal Actions, in Ireland, more beneficial, and also to prevent frivolous and vexatious Arrests; and to repeal so much of an Act, passed in the Parliament of Ireland in the twenty-first and twenty-second Years of the Reign of his present Majesty, intituled, "An act for enlarging the Time for Trials by Nisi Prius in the City and County of Dublin; and for making the Process of the Court of Exchequer more effectual, as relates to compelling the Appearance of Defendants in Personal Actions." (Note: Trials at Nisi Prius Act 1781 (21 & 22 Geo. 3. c. 18 (I))) (Repealed by Statute Law Revision Act 1872 (35 & 36 Vict. c. 63))
Parochial Schools (Scotland) Act 1803 (repealed)	43 Geo. 3. c. 54	11 June 1803
An act for making better Provision for the Parochial Schoolmasters, and for making further Regulations for the better Government of the Parish Schools in Scotland. (Repealed by Education (Scotland) Act 1872 (35 & 36 Vict. c. 62))
Defence of the Realm Act 1803 (repealed)	43 Geo. 3. c. 55	11 June 1803
An Act to enable his Majesty more effectually to provide for the Defence and Security of the Realm during the present War; and for indemnifying Persons who may suffer in their Property by such Measures as may be necessary for that Purpose. (Repealed by Statute Law Revision Act 1872 (35 & 36 Vict. c. 63))
Passenger Vessels Act 1803 or the Passenger Act 1803 (repealed)	43 Geo. 3. c. 56	24 June 1803
An Act for regulating the Vessels carrying Passengers from the United Kingdom to his Majesty's Plantations and Settlements abroad, or to Foreign Parts, with respect to the Number of such Passengers. (Repealed by Passenger Vessels Act 1823 (4 Geo. 4. c. 84))
Trade During Hostilities Act 1803 (repealed)	43 Geo. 3. c. 57	24 June 1803
An act for the better protection of the Trade of the United Kingdom during the present Hostilities with France. (Repealed by Statute Law Revision Act 1872 (35 & 36 Vict. c. 63))
Malicious Shooting or Stabbing Act 1803 or Lord Ellenborough's Act (repealed)	43 Geo. 3. c. 58	24 June 1803
An act for the further Prevention of malicious shooting, and attempting to discharge loaded Fire Arms, stabbing, Cutting, wounding, poisoning, and the malicious using of Means to procure the Miscarriage of Women; and also the malicious setting Fire to Buildings; and also for repealing a certain Act made in England in the twenty-third Year of the late King James the First, intituled, "An act to prevent the destroying and murthering of Bastard Children;" (Note: Concealment of Birth of Bastards Act 1623 (21 Jas. 1. c. 27)) and also an Act made in Ireland in the sixth Year of the Reign of the late Queen Anne, also intituled, "An act to prevent the destroying and murthering of Bastard Children;" (Note: Concealment of Birth of Bastards Act 1707 (6 Anne c. 4 (I))) and for making other Provisions in lieu thereof. (Repealed for England and Wales by Offences Against the Person Act 1828 (9 Geo. 4. c. 31), for Ireland by Offences Against the Person (Ireland) Act 1829 (10 Geo. 4. c. 34) and for India by Criminal Law (India) Act 1828 (9 Geo. 4. c. 74))
Bridges Act 1803	43 Geo. 3. c. 59	24 June 1803
An Act for remedying certain Defects in the Laws relative to the building and repairing of County Bridges, and other Works maintained at the Expense of the Inhabitants of Counties in England.
Exchequer Bills Act 1803 (repealed)	43 Geo. 3. c. 60	24 June 1803
An act for remedying certain Defects that have occurred in the issuing of certain Exchequer Bills. (Repealed by Statute Law Revision Act 1872 (35 & 36 Vict. c. 63))
Relief of Discharged Soldiers and Sailors Act 1803 (repealed)	43 Geo. 3. c. 61	24 June 1803
An act for the Relief of Soldiers, Sailors, and Marines, and of the Wives of Soldiers, in the Cases therein mentioned, so far as relates to England. (Repealed by Regulation of the Forces Act 1881 (44 & 45 Vict. c. 57))
Militia (Great Britain) (No. 2) Act 1803 (repealed)	43 Geo. 3. c. 62	24 June 1803
An act for transferring to the Royal Navy such Seamen as are now serving in the Militia of Great Britain. (Repealed by Statute Law Revision Act 1872 (35 & 36 Vict. c. 63))
East India Company (No. 2) Act 1803 (repealed)	43 Geo. 3. c. 63	24 June 1803
An act to explain and amend an Act, passed in the thirty-ninth Year of his present Majesty's Reign, intituled, "An act for regulating the Manner in which the United Company of Merchants of England trading to the East Indies, shall hire and take up Ships for their regular Service;" (Note: East India Company Act 1799 (39 Geo. 3. c. 89)) to continue until the twenty-fifth Day of March One thousand eight hundred and six. (Repealed by Statute Law Revision Act 1872 (35 & 36 Vict. c. 63))
Supply of Seamen Act 1803 (repealed)	43 Geo. 3. c. 64	24 June 1803
An act for the better Supply of Mariners and Seamen to serve in his Majesty's Ships of War, and on board Merchant Ships and other trading Ships and Vessels, during the present Hostilities. (Repealed by Statute Law Revision Act 1872 (35 & 36 Vict. c. 63))
Land for Ordnance Services Act 1803	43 Geo. 3. c. 65	24 June 1803
An act for vesting in Trustees certain Lands and Hereditaments, at Charlton, in the County of Kent, for further promoting the Service of his Majesty's Ordnance.
Land for Ordnance Services (No. 2) Act 1803	43 Geo. 3. c. 66	24 June 1803
An act for vesting in Trustees, certain Lands and Hereditaments at Weedon Beck, in the County of Northampton, for erecting Buildings thereon for the Service of his Majesty's Ordnance.
National Debt Act 1803 (repealed)	43 Geo. 3. c. 67	24 June 1803
An act for raising the Sum of twelve Millions by way of Annuities. (Repealed by Statute Law Revision Act 1870 (33 & 34 Vict. c. 69))
Customs Act 1803 (repealed)	43 Geo. 3. c. 68	24 June 1803
An act to repeal the Duties of Customs payable in Great Britain, and to grant other Duties in lieu thereof. (Repealed by Customs Law Repeal Act 1825 (6 Geo. 4. c. 105))
Excise Act 1803 (repealed)	43 Geo. 3. c. 69	4 July 1803
An act to repeal the Duties of Excise payable in Great Britain, and to grant other Duties in lieu thereof. (Repealed by Statute Law Revision Act 1861 (24 & 25 Vict. c. 101))
Customs (No. 2) Act 1803 (repealed)	43 Geo. 3. c. 70	4 July 1803
An act for granting to his Majesty, during the present War, and until the Ratification of a Definitive Treaty of Peace, additional Duties on the Importation and Exportation of certain Goods, Wares, and Merchandise, and on the Tonnage of Ships and Vessels in Great Britain. (Repealed by Statute Law Revision Act 1872 (35 & 36 Vict. c. 63))
Militia (Great Britain) (No. 3) Act 1803 (repealed)	43 Geo. 3. c. 71	4 July 1803
An act for augmenting the Number of Field Officers and other Officers of Militia within Great Britain. (Repealed by Statute Law Revision Act 1872 (35 & 36 Vict. c. 63))
Militia Allowances Act 1803 (repealed)	43 Geo. 3. c. 72	4 July 1803
An act for making Allowances in certain Cases to Subaltern Officers of the Militia in Great Britain, while disembodied. (Repealed by Statute Law Revision Act 1872 (35 & 36 Vict. c. 63))
Medicines Stamp Act 1803	43 Geo. 3. c. 73	4 July 1803
An act to amend an Act, passed in the forty-second Year of the Reign of his present Majesty, intituled, "An act to repeal an Act, passed in the twenty fifth Year of the Reign of his present Majesty, (Note: Medicine Duties Act 1785 (25 Geo. 3. c. 79)) for granting Stamp Duties on certain Medicine; and for charging other Duties in lieu thereof; and for making effectual Provision for the better Collection of the said Duties." (Note: Medicines Stamp Act 1802 (42 Geo. 3. c. 56))
Parliamentary Elections Act 1803	43 Geo. 3. c. 74	4 July 1803
An act for further regulating the Administration of the Oath or Affirmation required to be taken by Electors of Members to serve in Parliament, by an Act, passed in the second Year of King George the Second, intituled, "An act for the more effectual preventing Bribery and Corruption in the Election of Members to serve in Parliament." (Note: Corrupt Practices at Parliamentary Elections Act 1728 (2 Geo. 2. c. 24))
Estates of Lunatics Act 1803 (repealed)	43 Geo. 3. c. 75	4 July 1803
An act to authorize the Sale or Mortgage of the Estates of Persons found lunatick by Inquisition, in England or Ireland respectively; and the granting of Leases of the same. (Repealed by Infants' Property Act 1830 (11 Geo. 4. & 1 Will. 4. c. 65))
Militia (Ireland) (No. 2) Act 1803 (repealed)	43 Geo. 3. c. 76	4 July 1803
An act for transferring to the Royal Navy such Seamen as are now serving in the Militia of Ireland. (Repealed by Statute Law Revision Act 1872 (35 & 36 Vict. c. 63))
Indemnity (Ireland) Act 1803 (repealed)	43 Geo. 3. c. 77	4 July 1803
An act to indemnify Persons who have omitted to qualify themselves for Offices or Employments in Ireland, according to Law. (Repealed by Statute Law Revision Act 1872 (35 & 36 Vict. c. 63))
Trade Between Great Britain and Ireland Act 1803 (repealed)	43 Geo. 3. c. 78	4 July 1803
An act for continuing, until the first Day of July One thousand eight hundred and four, an Act passed in the forty-second Year of the Reign of his present Majesty, intituled, "An act for regulating, until the fifteenth day of February One thousand eight hundred and three, the Prices at which Grain, Meal, and Flour may be exported from Great Britain to Ireland, and from Ireland to Great Britain;" (Note: Trade in Grain, etc. Act 1802 (42 Geo. 3. c. 35)) and also an Act, (Note: Trade Between Great Britain and Ireland Act 1802 (43 Geo. 3. c. 14)) made in the present Session of Parliament, for continuing the said Act, and for permitting the Exportation of Seed Corn from Great Britain to Ireland, and the Importation of Malt into Great Britain from Ireland. (Repealed by Statute Law Revision Act 1872 (35 & 36 Vict. c. 63))
Wrecking (Ireland) Act 1803 (repealed)	43 Geo. 3. c. 79	4 July 1803
An act for making more effectual Provision within Ireland for the Punishment of Offences, in wilfully cading away, sinking, burning, or destroying Ships and Vessels; and for the more convenient Trial of Accessaries in Felonies. (Repealed by Criminal Statutes (Ireland) Repeal Act 1828 (9 Geo. 4. c. 53))
Highway (Scotland) Act 1803 or the Scottish Highland Roads and Bridges Act 1803 (repealed)	43 Geo. 3. c. 80	4 July 1803
An Act for granting to His Majesty the Sum of Twenty thousand Pounds to be issued and applies towards making Roads and building Bridges in the Highlands of Scotland; and for establishing the Proprietors of Land in Scotland to charge their Estates with a Proportion of the Expense of making and keeping in Repair Roads and Bridges in the Highlands of Scotland. (Repealed by Statute Law Revision Act 1872 (35 & 36 Vict. c. 63))
Excise (No. 2) Act 1803 (repealed)	43 Geo. 3. c. 81	5 July 1803
An act for granting to his Majesty, until twelve Months after the Ratification of the Definitive Treaty of Peace, certain additional Duties of Excise in Great Britain. (Repealed by Statute Law Revision Act 1872 (35 & 36 Vict. c. 63))
Defence of the Realm (England) Act 1803 (repealed)	43 Geo. 3. c. 82	6 July 1803
An act to enable his Majesty more effectually to raise and assemble in England, an additional Military Force, for the better Defence and Security of the United Kingdom, and for the more vigorous Prosecution of the War. (Repealed by Statute Law Revision Act 1872 (35 & 36 Vict. c. 63))
Defence of the Realm (Scotland) Act 1803 (repealed)	43 Geo. 3. c. 83	6 July 1803
An act to enable his Majesty more effectually to raise and assemble an additional Military Force in Scotland, for the better Defence and Security of the United Kingdom, and for the more vigorous Prosecution of the War. (Repealed by Statute Law Revision Act 1872 (35 & 36 Vict. c. 63))
Benefices (England) Act 1803 (repealed)	43 Geo. 3. c. 84	7 July 1803
An act to amend the Laws relating to Spiritual Persons holding of Farms; and for enforcing the Residence of Spiritual Persons on their Benefices in England. (Repealed by Residence on Benefices, etc. (England) Act 1817 (57 Geo. 3. c. 99))
Defence of the Realm (Ireland) Act 1803 (repealed)	43 Geo. 3. c. 85	11 July 1803
An act to enable his Majesty more effectually to raise and assemble, in Ireland, an additional Military force for the better Defence and Security of the United Kingdom, and for the more vigorous Prosecution of the War. (Repealed by Statute Law Revision Act 1872 (35 & 36 Vict. c. 63))
Unlawful Combinations (Ireland) Act 1803	43 Geo. 3. c. 86	11 July 1803
An act to prevent unlawful Combinations of Workmen Artificers, Journeymen, and Labourers in Ireland; and for other Purposes relating thereto.
Negotiation of Notes and Bills (Ireland) Act 1803 (repealed)	43 Geo. 3. c. 87	11 July 1803
An act to continue, during the Restriction on Payments in Cash by the Bank of Ireland, and to amend an Act made in the Parliament of Ireland, in the thirty-ninth Year of the Reign of his present Majesty, intituled, "An act to restrain the Negotiation of Promissory Notes and Inland Bills of Exchange, under a limited Sum;" (Note: Negotiation of Notes and Bills Act 1799 (39 Geo. 3. c. 48 (I))) and also an Act made in the Parliament of Ireland, in the fortieth Year of his present Majesty's Reign, (Note: Negotiation of Notes and Bills Act 1800 (40 Geo. 3. c. 64 (I))) to continue and amend the said Act. (Repealed by Promissory Notes, etc. (Ireland) Act 1805 (45 Geo. 3. c. 41))
Militia Pay (Ireland) Act 1803 (repealed)	43 Geo. 3. c. 88	11 July 1803
An act for defraying, until the twenty-fifth Day of March One thousand eight hundred and four, the Charge of the Pay and Clothing of the Militia of Ireland; for holding Courts Martial on Serjeant Majors, Serjeants, Corporals, and Drummers, for Offences committed during the Time such Militia shall not be embodied; and for making Allowances in certain Cases to Subaltern Officers of the said Militia during Peace. (Repealed by Statute Law Revision Act 1872 (35 & 36 Vict. c. 63))
Militia (Scotland) Act 1803	43 Geo. 3. c. 89	11 July 1803
An act for providing Relief for the Families of Militia Men in Scotland, when called out into actual Service.
Southern Whale Fishery Act 1803 (repealed)	43 Geo. 3. c. 90	11 July 1803
An act for enlarging the Limits of the Southern Whale Fishery. (Repealed by Statute Law Revision Act 1861 (24 & 25 Vict. c. 101))
Lotteries Act 1803 (repealed)	43 Geo. 3. c. 91	11 July 1803
An act for granting to his Majesty a certain Sum of Money to be raised by Lotteries. (Repealed by Statute Law Revision Act 1872 (35 & 36 Vict. c. 63))
Duties, etc. (Ireland) Act 1803 (repealed)	43 Geo. 3. c. 92	13 July 1803
An act for granting to his Majesty certain Duties on the Importation of Goods, Wares, and Merchandize into, and on Goods, Wines, and Merchandize exported from Ireland, and also certain Duties of Excise on Spirits and Malt distilled and made in Ireland. (Repealed by Statute Law Revision Act 1861 (24 & 25 Vict. c. 101))
Loans or Exchequer Bills (No. 2) Act 1803 (repealed)	43 Geo. 3. c. 93	13 July 1803
An act for raising the Sum of five Millions by Loans or Exchequer Bills, for the Service of Great Britain, for the Year One thousand eight hundred and three. (Repealed by Statute Law Revision Act 1872 (35 & 36 Vict. c. 63))
Militia Pay and Allowances Act 1803 (repealed)	43 Geo. 3. c. 94	13 July 1803
An act for defraying the Charge of the Pay and Clothing of the Militia in Great Britain for the Year One thousand eight hundred and three. (Repealed by Statute Law Revision Act 1872 (35 & 36 Vict. c. 63))
Militia Pay and Allowances (No. 2) Act 1803 (repealed)	43 Geo. 3. c. 95	13 July 1803
An act to revive and further continue, until the twenty-fifth Day of March One thousand eight hundred and four, and amend so much of an Act, made in the thirty-ninth and fortieth Years of the Reign of his present Majesty, (Note: Militia Allowances Act 1800 (39 & 40 Geo. 3. c. 44)) as grants certain Allowances to Adjutants and Serjeant Majors of the Militia of England, disembodied under an Act of the same Session of Parliament. (Note: Militia Act 1799 (39 & 40 Geo. 3. c. 1)) (Repealed by Statute Law Revision Act 1872 (35 & 36 Vict. c. 63))
Levy en Masse Act 1803 or the Defence of the Realm, etc. Act 1803 (repealed)	43 Geo. 3. c. 96	27 July 1803
An Act to amend and render more effectual, an Act passed in the present Session of Parliament, intituled, "An Act to enable His Majesty to provide for the Defence and Security of the Realm during the present War, and for indemnifying Persons who may suffer in their Property by such Measures as may be necessary for That Purpose;" (Note: Defence of the Realm Act 1803 (43 Geo. 3. c. 55)) and to enable his Majesty most effectually and speedily to exercise his ancient and undoubted Prerogative in requiring the Military Service of his liege Subjects in case of Invasion of the Realm. (Repealed by Defence of the Realm (No. 2) Act 1806 (46 Geo. 3. c. 90))
Collection of Revenue (Ireland) (No. 2) Act 1803 (repealed)	43 Geo. 3. c. 97	27 July 1803
An act to amend several Acts of Parliament for the better Collection and Security of his Majesty's Revenue of Customs and Excise in Ireland, and for preventing Frauds therein; and to make further Regulations relating thereto. (Repealed by Statute Law Revision Act 1872 (35 & 36 Vict. c. 63))
Collection of Revenue, etc. (Ireland) Act 1803 (repealed)	43 Geo. 3. c. 98	27 July 1803
An act to amend the Acts, now in Force, for securing the Collection of the Revenue upon Malt, and for regulating the Trade of a Distiller in Ireland. (Repealed by Statute Law Revision Act 1861 (24 & 25 Vict. c. 101))
Taxes Act 1803 (repealed)	43 Geo. 3. c. 99	27 July 1803
An act for consolidating certain of the Provisions contained in any Act or Acts relating to the Duties under the Management of the Commissioners for the Affairs of Taxes, and for amending the same. (Repealed by Taxes Management Act 1880 (43 & 44 Vict. c. 19))
Militia (Scotland) (No. 2) Act 1803 (repealed)	43 Geo. 3. c. 100	27 July 1803
An act to render more effectual two Acts, made in this present Session of Parliament, (Note: Militia Act 1803 (43 Geo. 3. c. 50)) (Note: Defence of the Realm (England) Act 1803 (43 Geo. 3. c. 82)) for the more speedily completing the Militia of Great Britain, and for raising an additional Military Force for the better Defence of the United Kingdom. (Repealed by Territorial Army and Militia Act 1921 (11 & 12 Geo. 5. c. 37))
Defence of the Realm, London Act 1803 (repealed)	43 Geo. 3. c. 101	27 July 1803
An act for raising in the City of London, a certain Number of Men as an Addition to the Military Force of Great Britain, for the better Defence and Security of the United Kingdom, and for the more vigorous Prosecution of the War. (Repealed by Defence of the Realm, London Act 1806 (46 Geo. 3. c. 144))
Caledonian Canal Act 1803	43 Geo. 3. c. 102	27 July 1803
An Act for granting to his Majesty the Sum of £20,000, towards defraying the Expense of making an Inland Navigation from the western to the eastern Sea, by Inverness and Fort William; and for taking the necessary steps towards executing the same.
Bonding of Wine Act 1803 (repealed)	43 Geo. 3. c. 103	27 July 1803
An act to permit Portugal Wine to be landed and warehoused in the United Kingdom without Payment of Duties, under certain Restrictions, for a limited Time. (Repealed by Statute Law Revision Act 1872 (35 & 36 Vict. c. 63))
Grenada and Saint Vincent Traders (No. 2) Act 1803 (repealed)	43 Geo. 3. c. 104	27 July 1803
An act to rectify a Mistake in an Act made in this present Session of Parliament, intituled, "An act for enlarging the Period for the Payment of Part of certain Sums of Money advanced by Way of Loan to several Persons connected with and trading to the islands of Grenada and Saint Vincent." (Note: Grenada and Saint Vincent Traders Act 1803 (43 Geo. 3. c. 40)) (Repealed by Statute Law Revision Act 1872 (35 & 36 Vict. c. 63))
Exportation (No. 2) Act 1803 (repealed)	43 Geo. 3. c. 105	27 July 1803
An act to permit the Exportation, for two Years, of a certain Quantity of Corn, Grain, Meal, Flour, Bread, Biscuit, or Pulse, to the Islands of Guernsey, Jersey, and Alderney, from other Ports in England as well as the Port of Southampton, under certain Restrictions. (Repealed by Statute Law Revision Act 1872 (35 & 36 Vict. c. 63))
Loans for Parsonages, etc. (Ireland) Act 1803 (repealed)	43 Geo. 3. c. 106	27 July 1803
An act to enable the Commissioners of First Fruits in Ireland to lend certain Sums of Money (Interest free), to Incumbents of Benefices there, for the Purpose of enabling them to erect or purchase Glebe Houses and Offices convenient for their Residence; and to purchase Glebe Lands fit and convenient for the Erection of such Houses and Offices; and to make Provision for the Repayment of all Loans so to be made by the said Commissioners. (Repealed by Church Temporalities (Ireland) Act 1833 (3 & 4 Will. 4. c. 37))
Queen Anne's Bounty Act 1803	43 Geo. 3. c. 107	27 July 1803
An act for effectuating certain Parts of an Act, passed in the second and third Years of the Reign of her late Majesty Queen Anne, intituled, "An act for the making more effectual her Majesty's gracious Intentions for the Augmentation of the Maintenance of the Poor Clergy, by enabling her Majesty to grant, in Perpetuity, the Revenues of the First Fruits and Tenths; and also for enabling any other Persons to make Grants for the same Purpose," (Note: Queen Anne's Bounty Act 1703 (2 & 3 Ann. c. 20)) so for as the same relate to Deeds and Wills made for granting and bequeathing Lands, Tenements, Hereditaments, Goods, and Chattels, to the Governors of the Bounty of Queen Anne, for the Purposes in the said Act mentioned: and for enlarging the Powers of the said Governors.
Gifts for Churches Act 1803	43 Geo. 3. c. 108	27 July 1803
An Act to promote the building, repairing, or otherwise providing of Churches and Chapels, and of Houses for the Residence of Ministers, and the providing of Church Yards and Glebes.
Benefices (England) (No. 2) Act 1803 (repealed)	43 Geo. 3. c. 109	27 July 1803
An act to rectify a Mistake in an Act, made in this present Session of Parliament, intituled, "An act to amend the Laws relating to Spiritual Persons bolding of Farms; and for enforcing the Residence of Spiritual Persons on their Benefices in England;" (Note: Benefices (England) Act 1803 (43 Geo. 3. c. 84)) and to remove a Doubt respecting the Title of the Statute of the twenty-first Year of King Henry the Eighth therein mentioned. (Repealed by Residence on Benefices, etc. (England) Act 1817 (57 Geo. 3. c. 99))
Loans for Erection of Workhouses Act 1803 (repealed)	43 Geo. 3. c. 110	27 July 1803
An act to explain and amend an Act, made in the last Session of Parliament, (Note: Loans for Erection of Workhouses Act 1802 (42 Geo. 3. c. 74)) intituled, "An act to amend an Act, made in the twenty second Year of the Reign of his present Majesty, (Note: Relief of the Poor Act 1782 (22 Geo. 3. c. 83)) for the better Relief and Employment of the Poor, so far as relates to the Payment of the Debts incurred for building any Poor House." (Repealed by Statute Law Revision Act 1872 (35 & 36 Vict. c. 63))
Friendly Societies Act 1803 (repealed)	43 Geo. 3. c. 111	27 July 1803
An act for enabling Friendly Societies, intended to be established under an Act passed in the thirty-third Year of the Reign of his present Majesty, (Note: Friendly Societies Act 1793 (33 Geo. 3. c. 54)) to rectify Mistakes made in the Registry of their Rules. (Repealed by Friendly Societies Act 1855 (18 & 19 Vict. c. 63))
Preservation of Black Game Act 1803 (repealed)	43 Geo. 3. c. 112	27 July 1803
An act for the better Preservation of Heath Fowl, commonly called Black Game, in the New Forest, in the County of Southampton. (Repealed by Game Act 1831 (1 & 2 Will. 4. c. 32))
Casting Away of Vessels, etc. Act 1803 (repealed)	43 Geo. 3. c. 113	27 July 1803
An act for the more effectually providing for the Punishment of Offences in wilfully casting away, burning, or destroying Ships and Vessels; and for the more convenient Trial of Accessaries in Felonies; and for extending the Powers of an Act made in the thirty-third Year of the Reign of King Henry the Eighth, (Note: Criminal Law Act 1541 (33 Hen. 8. c. 23)) as far as relates to Murders, to Accessaries to Murders, and to Manslaughters. (Repealed by Statute Law Revision Act 1861 (24 & 25 Vict. c. 101))
Treasury Bills (Ireland) Act 1803 (repealed)	43 Geo. 3. c. 114	27 July 1803
An act for raising the Sum of one Million Irish Currency, by Treasury Bills, for the Service of Ireland, for the Year One thousand eight hundred and three. (Repealed by Statute Law Revision Act 1872 (35 & 36 Vict. c. 63))
Excisable Goods on the Thames Act 1803 (repealed)	43 Geo. 3. c. 115	27 July 1803
An act to explain and amend two Acts, made in the second, (Note: Thefts Upon the Thames Act 1762 (2 Geo. 3. c. 28)) and thirty-ninth and fortieth (Note: Depredations on the Thames Act 1800 (39 & 40 Geo. 3. c. 87)) Years of the Reign of his prefect Majesty, for preventing the committing of Thefts and Frauds by Persons navigating Bum Boats, and other Boats upon the River Thames, and for the more effectual Prevention of Depredations thereon, so far as relates to the Seizure of Exciseable Commodities. (Repealed by Statute Law Revision Act 1872 (35 & 36 Vict. c. 63))
Habeas Corpus Suspension (Ireland) Act 1803 (repealed)	43 Geo. 3. c. 116	29 July 1803
An act to empower the Lord Lieutenant, or other Chief Governor or Governors of Ireland to apprehend and detain such Persons as he or they shall suspect for conspiring against his Majesty's Person and Government, until six Weeks after the Commencement of the next Session of Parliament. (Repealed by Statute Law Revision Act 1872 (35 & 36 Vict. c. 63))
Suppression of Rebellion, etc. (Ireland) Act 1803 (repealed)	43 Geo. 3. c. 117	29 July 1803
An act for the Suppression of Rebellion in Ireland, and for the Protection of the Persons and Property of his Majesty's faithful Subjects there, to continue in Force until six Weeks after the Commencement of the next Session of Parliament. (Repealed by Statute Law Revision Act 1872 (35 & 36 Vict. c. 63))
Discovery of Longitude at Sea, etc. Act 1803 (repealed)	43 Geo. 3. c. 118	29 July 1803
An act to render more effectual an Act, passed in the fifth Year of the Reign of his present Majesty, (Note: Discovery of Longitude at Sea (No. 2) Act 1765 (5 Geo. 3. c. 20)) relating to the Discovery of the Longitude at Sea, and for continuing the Encouragement of Persons making certain Discoveries for finding the Longitude at Sea, or other useful Discoveries and Improvements in Navigation, and for making Experiments relating thereto; and for discharging certain Debts incurred by the Commissioners of the Longitude in carrying the Acts relating thereto into Execution. (Repealed by Statute Law Revision Act 1861 (24 & 25 Vict. c. 101))
Chest at Chatham Act 1803 (repealed)	43 Geo. 3. c. 119	29 July 1803
An act for improving the Funds of the Chest at Chatham, and for transferring the Administration of the same to Greenwich Hospital; and for ameliorating the Condition of the Pensioners on the said Funds. (Repealed by Greenwich Hospital Outpensions, etc. Act 1829 (10 Geo. 4. c. 26))
Levy en Masse Amendment Act 1803 or the Defence of the Realm Act 1803 (repealed)	43 Geo. 3. c. 120	11 August 1803
Act to amend an Act made in this present Session of Parliament (Note: Levy en Masse Act 1803 (43 Geo. 3. c. 96)) intituled "An Act to amend and render more effectual an Act passed in the present Session of Parliament intituled 'An Act to enable his Majesty more effectually to provide for the Defence and Security of the Realm during the present War and for indemnifying Persons who may suffer in their Property by such Measures as may be necessary for that Purpose' and to enable his Majesty more effectually and speedily to exercise his ancient and undoubted Prerogative in requiring the Military Service of his liege Subjects in case of Invasion of the Realm." (Repealed by Defence of the Realm (No. 2) Act 1806 (46 Geo. 3. c. 90))
Yeomanry and Volunteer Cavalry Act 1803 (repealed)	43 Geo. 3. c. 121	11 August 1803
An act for authorizing the billetting of such Troops of Yeomanry and Volunteer Cavalry as may be desirous of assembling for the Purpose of being trained together, in Great Britain and Ireland; and for subjecting to Military Discipline, during the War, such Serjeants serving in any Volunteer or Yeomanry Corps of Cavalry or Infantry as receive constant Pay, and all Trumpeters, Drummers, or Bugle Men serving therein, and receiving Pay at any daily or weekly Rate; and for the further regulating of such Yeomanry and Volunteer Corps. (Repealed by Statute Law Revision Act 1872 (35 & 36 Vict. c. 63))
Income Tax Act 1803 (repealed)	43 Geo. 3. c. 122	11 August 1803
An act for granting to his Majesty, until the sixth Day of May next after the Ratification of a Definitive Treaty of Peace, a Contribution on the Profits arising from Property, Professions, Trades, and Offices. (Repealed by Statute Law Revision Act 1872 (35 & 36 Vict. c. 63))
Defence of the Realm (England) (No. 2) Act 1803 (repealed)	43 Geo. 3. c. 123	11 August 1803
An act for exempting Persons serving, or who have found Substitutes to serve, in the additional Military Force, raised under an Act of this Session of Parliament, from being ballotted to serve in the Militia of England. (Repealed by Statute Law Revision Act 1872 (35 & 36 Vict. c. 63))
Defence of the Realm (Scotland) (No. 2) Act 1803 (repealed)	43 Geo. 3. c. 124	11 August 1803
An act to rectify a Mistake in an Act, made in the present Session of Parliament, (Note: Defence of the Realm (Scotland) Act 1803 (43 Geo. 3. c. 83)) for raising an additional Military Force in Scotland; and for exempting Persons serving therein, either personally or by Substitute, from being ballotted to serve in the Militia of Scotland. (Repealed by Statute Law Revision Act 1861 (24 & 25 Vict. c. 101))
Levy en Masse (London) Act 1803 or the Defence of the Realm Act 1803 (repealed)	43 Geo. 3. c. 125	11 August 1803
An act to empower his Majesty's Commissioners of Lieutenancy for the City of London to carry into Execution, within the said City, an Act passed in the present Session of Parliament, intituled, "An act to amend and render more effectual an Act passed in the present Session of Parliament, intituled, 'An act to enable his Majesty more effectually to provide for the Defence and Security of the Realm during the present War, and for indemnifying Persons who may suffer in their Property by such Measures as may be necessary for that Purpose;' and to enable his Majesty more effectually and speedily to exercise his ancient and undoubted Prerogative, in requiring the Military Service of his liege Subjects in case of Invasion of the Realm." (Repealed by Statute Law Revision Act 1872 (35 & 36 Vict. c. 63))
Stamps (No. 2) Act 1803 (repealed)	43 Geo. 3. c. 126	11 August 1803
An act for granting to his Majesty certain Duties on Receipts. (Repealed by Inland Revenue Repeal Act 1870 (33 & 34 Vict. c. 99))
Stamps (No. 3) Act 1803 (repealed)	43 Geo. 3. c. 127	11 August 1803
An act for consolidating the Duties on stamped Vellum, Parchment, and Paper, in Great Britain. (Repealed by Inland Revenue Repeal Act 1870 (33 & 34 Vict. c. 99))
Customs (No. 3) Act 1803 (repealed)	43 Geo. 3. c. 128	11 August 1803
An act for the further Regulation of the Collection of the Duties of Customs in Great Britain, in certain Cases. (Repealed by Customs Law Repeal Act 1825 (6 Geo. 4. c. 105))
Excise (No. 3) Act 1803 (repealed)	43 Geo. 3. c. 129	11 August 1803
An act to amend so much of an Act made in this Session of Parliament, (Note: Excise (No. 2) Act 1803 (43 Geo. 3. c. 81)) for granting additional Duties of Excise, as relates to the Exportation of Tea to Ireland; for regulating the granting of Permits for the Removal of Coffee, Tea, and Cocoa Nuts out of Warehouse, and for more effectually securing the Duties on Coffee. (Repealed by Customs and Inland Revenue Act 1882 (45 & 46 Vict. c. 41))
Duties on Auctioneers, etc. Act 1803 (repealed)	43 Geo. 3. c. 130	11 August 1803
An act for rectifying a Mistake in an Act of the last Session of Parliament (Note: Excise Act 1802 (42 Geo. 3. c. 93)) for better collecting the Duties on Auctioneers. (Repealed by Statute Law Revision Act 1861 (24 & 25 Vict. c. 101))
Customs (No. 4) Act 1803 (repealed)	43 Geo. 3. c. 131	11 August 1803
An act for charging an additional Duty on Lignum Quassia (Note: Quassia wood.) imported into Great Britain. (Repealed by Statute Law Revision Act 1861 (24 & 25 Vict. c. 101))
Warehousing of Goods Act 1803 (repealed)	43 Geo. 3. c. 132	11 August 1803
An act for permitting certain Goods imported into Great Britain, to be secured in Warehouse without Payment of Duty. (Repealed by Warehousing of Goods Act 1823 (4 Geo. 4. c. 24))
Tortola Trade, etc. Act 1803 (repealed)	43 Geo. 3. c. 133	11 August 1803
An act to continue, until the twenty-fifth Day of March One thousand eight hundred and eight, an Act, made in the forty-second Year of the Reign of his present Majesty, (Note: Tortola Trade Act 1802 (42 Geo. 3. c. 102)) for enabling his Majesty to permit the Importation and Exportation of certain Goods and Commodities into the Port of Tortola; and to continue, until the fourteenth Day of June One thousand eight hundred and eight, and from thence to the End of the then next Session of Parliament, and amend so much of an Act, made in the sixth Year of the Reign of his present Majesty, (Note: Importation, etc. Act 1766 (6 Geo. 3. c. 28)) as relates to the prohibiting the Importation of foreign Wrought Silks and Velvets into Great Britain. (Repealed by Statute Law Revision Act 1872 (35 & 36 Vict. c. 63))
Prize Goods Act 1803 (repealed)	43 Geo. 3. c. 134	11 August 1803
An act for the Relief of the Captors of Prizes, with respect to the bringing and landing certain Prize Goods in Great Britain, during Hostilities. (Repealed by Naval Prize Acts Repeal Act 1864 (27 & 28 Vict. c. 23))
American Treaty Commissioners Act 1803 (repealed)	43 Geo. 3. c. 135	11 August 1803
An act for the removing of Doubts respecting the Validity of Assignments made or to be made pursuant to the Awards of the Commissioners acting under the seventh Article of the Treaty with the United States of America; and for the better Enabling of his Majesty to recover the Interests so assigned. (Repealed by Statute Law Revision Act 1872 (35 & 36 Vict. c. 63))
Woollen Manufacture Act 1803 (repealed)	43 Geo. 3. c. 136	11 August 1803
An act to suspend, until the first Day of July One thousand eight hundred and four, Proceedings in Actions, Prosecutions, and Proceedings, under certain Acts relating to the Woollen Manufacture, and also under an Act of the Reign of Queen Elizabeth, (Note: Statute of Artificers 1562 (5 Eliz. 1. c. 4)) so far as the same relates to certain Persons employed or concerned in the said Manufacture. (Repealed by Statute Law Revision Act 1872 (35 & 36 Vict. c. 63))
East India Company (No. 3) Act 1803 (repealed)	43 Geo. 3. c. 137	11 August 1803
An act to enable the Court of Directors of the East India Company to make reasonable Allowances to the Owners of certain Ships, in the Service of the said Company, on account of the extraordinary Expence attending the Outfit of the said Ships, between certain Periods. (Repealed by Statute Law Revision Act 1872 (35 & 36 Vict. c. 63))
Courts of Justice, Canada Act 1803 or the Canada Jurisdiction Act 1803 (repealed)	43 Geo. 3. c. 138	11 August 1803
An act for extending the Jurisdiction of the Courts of Justice in the Provinces of Lower and Upper Canada, to the Trial and Punishment of Persons guilty of Crimes and Offences within certain Parts of North America adjoining to the said Provinces. (Repealed by Statute Law Revision Act 1872 (35 & 36 Vict. c. 63))
Forgery of Foreign Bills Act 1803 (repealed)	43 Geo. 3. c. 139	11 August 1803
An Act for preventing the forging and counterfeiting of Foreign Bills of Exchange, and of Foreign Promissory Notes and Orders for the Payment of Money; and for preventing the counterfeiting of Foreign Copper Money. (Repealed by Statute Law (Repeals) Act 2013 (c. 2))
Habeas Corpus Act 1803	43 Geo. 3. c. 140	11 August 1803
An Act to enable the Judges of His Majesty's Courts of Record at Westminster to award Writs of Habeas Corpus for bringing persons detained in Gaol before Courts Martial, and the several Commissioners therein mentioned.
Justices Protection Act 1803	43 Geo. 3. c. 141	11 August 1803
An Act to render Justices of the Peace more safe in the Execution of their Duty.
Militia (Ireland) (No. 3) Act 1803 (repealed)	43 Geo. 3. c. 142	11 August 1803
An act to make Provision, in certain Cases, for the Wives and Families of ballotted Men, Substitutes, and Volunteers, Serving in the Militia of Ireland. (Repealed by Militia (Ireland) (No. 3) Act 1809 (49 Geo. 3. c. 86))
Public Officers Protection (Ireland) Act 1803 (repealed)	43 Geo. 3. c. 143	11 August 1803
An Act for the rendering Justices of the Peace and Governors and Deputy Governors of Counties and Places in Ireland more safe in the Execution of their Office; and for indemnifying Constables and others acting in Obedience to the Warrants of such Justices of the Peace, Governors, and Deputy Governors respectively. (Repealed by Police (Northern Ireland) Act 1998 (c. 32))
Poor Act 1803 (repealed)	43 Geo. 3. c. 144	11 August 1803
An act for procuring Returns relative to the Expence and Maintenance of the Poor in England. (Repealed by Statute Law Revision Act 1872 (35 & 36 Vict. c. 63))
Malt Duties, etc. (Scotland) Act 1803 (repealed)	43 Geo. 3. c. 145	11 August 1803
An act for more effectually securing certain Duties on Malt, and for preventing Frauds by Makers of Malt from Beer or Bigg in Scotland. (Repealed by Statute Law Revision Act 1872 (35 & 36 Vict. c. 63))
Loans or Exchequer Bills (No. 3) Act 1803 (repealed)	43 Geo. 3. c. 146	11 August 1803
An act for enabling his Majesty to raise the Sum of two Millions for the Uses and Purposes therein mentioned. (Repealed by Statute Law Revision Act 1872 (35 & 36 Vict. c. 63))
Loans or Exchequer Bills (No. 4) Act 1803 (repealed)	43 Geo. 3. c. 147	11 August 1803
An act for raising the Sum of one million five hundred thousand Pounds, by Loans or Exchequer Bills, for the Service of Great Britain for the Year One thousand eight hundred and three. (Repealed by Statute Law Revision Act 1872 (35 & 36 Vict. c. 63))
Exchequer Bills Act 1803 (repealed)	43 Geo. 3. c. 148	11 August 1803
An act to enable the Lords Commissioners of his Majesty's Treasury of Great Britain to issue Exchequer Bills on the Credit of such Aids or Supplies as have been or shall be granted by Parliament for the Service of Great Britain for the Year One thousand eight hundred and three. (Repealed by Statute Law Revision Act 1872 (35 & 36 Vict. c. 63))
Grant to the House of Orange Act 1803 (repealed)	43 Geo. 3. c. 149	11 August 1803
An act for enabling his Majesty to settle an Annuity of sixteen thousand Pounds on the House of Orange, during his Majesty's Pleasure. (Repealed by Statute Law Revision Act 1872 (35 & 36 Vict. c. 63))
Taxes (Scotland) Act 1803 (repealed)	43 Geo. 3. c. 150	11 August 1803
An act for consolidating certain of the Provisions contained in any Act or Acts, relating to the Duties under the Management of the Commissioners for the Affairs of Taxes; and for amending the said Acts, so far as the same relate to that Part of Great Britain called Scotland. (Repealed by Taxes Management Act 1880 (43 & 44 Vict. c. 19))
Cotton Manufacture (Scotland) Act 1803 (repealed)	43 Geo. 3. c. 151	11 August 1803
An act for preventing and settling Disputes which may arise between Masters and Weavers engaged in the Cotton Manufacture in Scotland, and Persons employed by such Weavers and Persons engaged in ornamenting Cotton Goods by the Needle. (Repealed by Masters and Workmen Arbitration Act 1824 (5 Geo. 4. c. 96)
Pilots of Dover, etc. Act 1803 (repealed)	43 Geo. 3. c. 152	11 August 1803
An act to amend so much of an Act made in the seventh Year of the Reign of his late Majesty King George the First, intituled, "An act for the further preventing his Majesty's Subjects from trading to the East Indies under foreign Commissions, and for encouraging and further securing the lawful Trade thereto; and for further regulating the Pilots of Dover, Deal, and the Isle of Thanet," (Note: Trade to East Indies, etc. Act 1720 (7 Geo. 1. St. 1. c. 21)) as relates to the said Pilots. (Repealed by Statute Law Revision Act 1861 (24 & 25 Vict. c. 101))
Importation in Neutral Vessel, etc. Act 1803 (repealed)	43 Geo. 3. c. 153	12 August 1803
An act to permit, during the Continuance of Hostilities, and until six Months after the Ratification of a Definitive Treaty of Peace, the Importation into Great Britain and Ireland in neutral Vessels, from States in Amity with his Majesty, of certain Goods, Wares, and Merchandize; and to empower his Majesty, by Order in Council, to prohibit the Exportation of Copper, and to permit the Importation, in neutral Vessels, from States not in Amity with his Majesty, of certain Goods, Wares, and Merchandize. (Repealed by Customs Law Repeal Act 1825 (6 Geo. 4. c. 105))
Countervailing Duty Act 1803 (repealed)	43 Geo. 3. c. 154	12 August 1803
An act for granting to his Majesty certain countervailing Duties on the Importation into Great Britain of refined Sugar of the Manufacture of Ireland; and for allowing additional Drawbacks or Bounties on the Exportation to Ireland of refined Sugar of the Manufacture of Great Britain, during the Continuance of certain Acts; and for allowing, until the first Day of May One thousand eight hundred and four, a Bounty on the Importation of Salmon and Cod Fish from the Island of Newfoundland and the Coast of Labrador into Great Britain and Ireland. (Repealed by Statute Law Revision Act 1872 (35 & 36 Vict. c. 63))
Aliens Act 1803 (repealed)	43 Geo. 3. c. 155	12 August 1803
An act to repeal an Act passed in the last Session of Parliament, (Note: Aliens Act 1802 (42 Geo. 3. c. 92)) for establishing Regulations respecting Aliens arriving in this Kingdom, or resident therein; and for establishing until three Months after the Ratification of a Definitive Treaty of Peace, Regulations respecting Aliens arriving in this Kingdom, or residing therein, in certain Cases. (Repealed by Statute Law Revision Act 1872 (35 & 36 Vict. c. 63))
Prisage and Butlerage of Wines Act 1803 (repealed)	43 Geo. 3. c. 156	12 August 1803
An act to enable the Commissioners of his Majesty's Treasury of Great Britain, to contract for the Purchase of the Duties of Prisage and Butlerage of Wines. (Repealed by Statute Law Revision Act 1872 (35 & 36 Vict. c. 63))
Smuggling Act 1803 (repealed)	43 Geo. 3. c. 157	12 August 1803
An act to make perpetual so much of an Act, made in the nineteenth Year of the Reign of King George the Second, (Note: Offences against Customs or Excise Act 1745 (19 Geo. 2. c. 34)) as relates to the further Punishment of Persons going armed or disguised, and to the Relief of Officers of the Customs in Informations upon Seizures. (Repealed by Statute Law Revision Act 1872 (35 & 36 Vict. c. 63))
Glebe Houses (Ireland) Act 1803 (repealed)	43 Geo. 3. c. 158	12 August 1803
An act for granting to his Majesty the Sum of fifty thousand Pounds, for building Glebe Houses in Ireland. (Repealed by Statute Law Revision Act 1861 (24 & 25 Vict. c. 101))
Annuity (Lord Amherst) Act 1803 (repealed)	43 Geo. 3. c. 159	12 August 1803
An act for settling and securing a certain Annuity on William Lord Amherst, (Note: William Amherst, 1st Earl Amherst.) and the Representatives of the late Jeffery Lord Amherst, (Note: Jeffery Amherst, 1st Baron Amherst.) in Consideration of the eminent Services performed by him during his Command in America. (Repealed by Statute Law Revision (No. 2) Act 1893 (56 & 57 Vict. c. 54))
Encouragement of Seamen, etc. Act 1803 (repealed)	43 Geo. 3. c. 160	12 August 1803
An act for the Encouragement of Seamen, and for the better and more effectually manning his Majesty's Navy; for regulating the Payment of Prize Money, and for making Provision for the Salaries of the Judges of the Vice Admiralty Courts in the Island of Malta and in the Bermuda and Bahama Islands. (Repealed by Naval Prize Acts Repeal Act 1864 (27 & 28 Vict. c. 23))
House Tax Act 1803 (repealed)	43 Geo. 3. c. 161	12 August 1803
An act for repealing the several Duties under the Management of the Commissioners for the Affairs of Taxes, and granting new Duties in lieu thereof; for granting new Duties in certain Cases therein mentioned; for repealing the Duties of Excise on Licences, and on Carriages constructed by Coachmakers, and granting new Duties thereon, under the Management of the said Commissioners for the Affairs of Taxes; and also new Duties on Persons selling Carriages by Auction, or on Commission. (Repealed by Finance Act 1924 (14 & 15 Geo. 5. c. 21))
Appropriation Act 1803 (repealed)	43 Geo. 3. c. 162	12 August 1803
An act for granting to his Majesty certain Sums of Money out of the respective Consolidated Funds of Great Britain and Ireland; for applying certain Monies therein mentioned for the Service of the Year One thousand eight hundred and three; and for further appropriating the Supplies granted in this Session of Parliament. (Repealed by Statute Law Revision Act 1872 (35 & 36 Vict. c. 63))

=== Local acts ===
Short title	Citation	Royal assent
Long title
Weymouth, Melcombe Regis, Dorchester and Warmwell Roads Act 1803 (repealed)	43 Geo. 3. c. iv	24 March 1803
An Act to continue and amend Two Acts, severally passed in the First (Note: Dorset Roads Act 1760 (1 Geo. 3. c. 24)) and Twenty-second (Note: Dorset Roads Act 1782 (22 Geo. 3. c. 101)) Years of the Reign of His present Majesty, for repairing several Roads leading to and through the Towns of Weymouth and Melcombe Regis, and Dorchester, and also the Road leading from the Parish of Warmwell to the Church in the Parish of Osmington, all in the County of Dorset. (Repealed by Weymouth, Melcombe Regis and Dorchester Roads Act 1825 (6 Geo. 4. c. c))
Boroughbridge, Catterick and Piersebridge Road Act 1803 (repealed)	43 Geo. 3. c. v	24 March 1803
An Act to continue and enlarge the Terms and Powers of three Acts, made in the sixteenth (Note: Boroughbridge, Catterick and Piersebridge Road Act 1742 (16 Geo. 2. c. 7)) and twenty-second (Note: Boroughbridge, Catterick and Piersebridge Road Act 1748 (22 Geo. 2. c. 39)) Years of the Reign of his late Majesty King George the Second, and in the twenty-fourth Year of the Reign of his present Majesty, (Note: Boroughbridge, Catterick and Piersebridge Road Act 1783 (24 Geo. 3. Sess. 1. c. 29)) for repairing the High Road from Borough-bridge, in the County of York, to Catherick, in the same County, and from thence to Piers-bridge, on the River Tees. (Repealed by Boroughbridge, Catterick and Piersbridge Road Act 1825 (6 Geo. 4. c. ix))
Stone and Stafford Road Act 1803 (repealed)	43 Geo. 3. c. vi	24 March 1803
An Act for enlarging the Term and Powers of Two Acts, made in the First (Note: Stafford, Worcester and Warwick Roads Act 1760 (1 Geo. 3. c. 39)) and Twenty-second (Note: Stafford, Worcester and Warwick Roads Act 1782 (22 Geo. 3. c. 96)) Years of the Reign of His present Majesty, so far as the same relate to the Road leading from the Town of Stone, in the County of Stafford, to a certain Gate in the Borough of Stafford called Gaol Gate, and from a certain Gate on the South Side of the said Borough called Green Gate, through the Towns of Dunston and Penkridge, to a Road called Streetway, in the Road to Wolverhampton, in the said County of Stafford. (Repealed by Stone, Stafford and Penkridge Turnpike Road Act 1824 (5 Geo. 4. c. lix))
Winston Bridge Road Act 1803 (repealed)	43 Geo. 3. c. vii	24 March 1803
An Act to continue and enlarge the Term and Powers of two Acts made in the first (Note: Yorks and Durham Roads Act 1760 (1 Geo. 3. c. 41)) and twenty-second (Note: Yorkshire and Durham Roads Act 1782 (22 Geo. 3. c. 93)) Years of the Reign of his present Majesty, for amending and widening the Roads from the Turnpike Road upon Gatherly Moor, in the County of York to Staindrop, in the County of Durham, and from the said Turnpike Road near Smallways, across the River Tees, to Winston, in the said County of Durham. (Repealed by Gatherley Moor and Staindrop, and Smallways and Winston Roads Act 1825 (6 Geo. 4. c. vii))
Grand Junction Canal Act 1803	43 Geo. 3. c. viii	24 March 1803
An Act for empowering the Company of Proprietors of The Grand Junction Canal, to raise a further Sum of Money to enable them to complete the Works authorized to be executed in pursuance of the several Acts passed in the Thirty-third, (Note: Grand Junction Canal Act 1793 (33 Geo. 3. c. 80)) Thirty-fourth, (Note: Grand Junction Canal Act 1794 (34 Geo. 3. c. 24)) Thirty-fifth, (Note: Grand Junction Canal (No. 1) Act 1795 (35 Geo. 3. c. 8)) (Note: Grand Junction Canal (No. 2) Act 1795 (35 Geo. 3. c. 43)) (Note: Grand Junction Canal (No. 3) Act 1795 (35 Geo. 3. c. 85)) Thirty-sixth, (Note: Grand Junction Canal (No. 4) Act 1795 (36 Geo. 3. c. 25)) Thirty-eighth, (Note: Grand Junction Canal Act 1798 (38 Geo. 3. c. xxxiii)) and Forty-first (Note: Grand Junction Canal Act 1801 (41 Geo. 3. (U.K.) c. lxxi)) Years of the Reign of His present Majesty; and for amending, altering, and enlarging the Powers and Provisions of the said Acts.
St. Peter's Church, St. Albans Act 1803	43 Geo. 3. c. ix	24 March 1803
An Act for rebuilding the Tower of the Parish Church of Saint Peter, in the Borough and Liberty of Saint Alban, in the County of Hertford, together with the Chancel thereof; and for more effectually repairing the said Parish Church.
Kensington Improvement Act 1803 (repealed)	43 Geo. 3. c. x	24 March 1803
An Act for paving, repairing, lighting, watching, and otherwise improving Kensington Square, (Note: Kensington Square. 51°30′02″N 0°11′24″W) and Young Street, (Note: Young Street, South Kensington. 51°30′06″N 0°11′24″W) and James Street (Note: James Street, now Ansdell Street, South Kensington. 51°30′00″N 0°11′19″W) communicating therewith, in the Parish of Saint Mary Abbotts, Kensington, in the County of Middlesex, and for removing and preventing Nuisances, Annoyances, and Encroachments therein. (Repealed by Kensington Improvement Act 1851 (14 & 15 Vict. c. cxvi))
Hans Town (Chelsea) Improvement Act 1803 (repealed)	43 Geo. 3. c. xi	24 March 1803
An Act for amending, altering, and enlarging the Powers of an Act passed in the thirtieth Year of the Reign of his present Majesty, intituled, "An Act for forming and keeping in Repair, the Streets, and other publick Passages and Places, within a certain District in the Parish of Saint Luke Chelsea, in the County of Middlesex, called Hans Town, and for otherwise improving the same." (Note: Hans Town, Chelsea Improvement Act 1790 (30 Geo. 3. c. 76)) (Repealed by Statute Law (Repeals) Act 2013 (c. 2))
Leeds Coal Supply Act 1803 (repealed)	43 Geo. 3. c. xii	24 March 1803
An Act for amending and enlarging the Powers of several Acts made in the thirty-first Year of the Reign of his late Majesty King George the Second, (Note: Middleton Railway Act 1757 (31 Geo. 2. c. 22 Pr.)) and in the nineteenth (Note: Leeds Coal Supply Act 1779 (19 Geo. 3. c. 11)) and thirty-third (Note: Leeds Coal Supply Act 1793 (33 Geo. 3. c. 86)) Years of the Reign of his present Majesty, for the better supplying of the Town and Neighbourhood of Leeds in the County of York with Coals. (Repealed by Statute Law (Repeals) Act 1978 (c. 45))
Road from the Maidstone Turnpike Gate Act 1803 (repealed)	43 Geo. 3. c. xiii	24 March 1803
An Act for repairing, altering, widening, and improving the Road leading from the Maidstone Turnpike Gate, situate on the Loose Road near Sutton Lane, in the Parish of Maidstone, to The King's Head Inn in Sutton Valence, in the County of Kent. (Repealed by Maidstone and Sutton Valence Road Act 1814 (54 Geo. 3. c. lvii))
Bridgetown Roads Act 1803 (repealed)	43 Geo. 3. c. xiv	24 March 1803
An Act for continuing and amending an Act, passed in the twentieth Year of the Reign of his present Majesty, (Note: Devon Roads Act 1780 (20 Geo. 3. c. 79)) for repairing the Road leading from the End of the Exeter Turnpike Road, on the west Side of Lord Clifford's Park Gate to Biddaford, and also several Roads leading from Bridgetown, in the County of Devon; and for varying the Line of certain Parts of the said Roads, and also for extending the Provisions of the said Act to the Road leading from the Termination of one of the said Roads, at or near the Bottom of Water Lane, in the Parish of Totnes, to a Place called Luscombe Cross, in the Parish of Harberton, in the said County of Devon. (Repealed by Road from the end of the Exeter Turnpike Road, and Totnes Bridge Act 1824 (5 Geo. 4. c. xii))
Efford Quay and Plymouth Road Act 1803	43 Geo. 3. c. xv	24 March 1803
An Act to enable the Company of Proprietors for embanking Part of The Lairy near Plymouth, to make and maintain a Road from a certain Place called Efford Quay, in the Parish of Egg Buckland, in the County of Devon, to the Borough of Plymouth.
Road from Kensington through Brentford Act 1803 (repealed)	43 Geo. 3. c. xvi	24 March 1803
An Act to alter and enlarge the Powers of three Acts, made in the seventh, (Note: Middlesex Roads Act 1766 (7 Geo. 3. c. 88)) thirty-first, (Note: Brentford Road Act 1791 (31 Geo. 3. c. 124)) and thirty-fifth (Note: Middlesex Roads Act 1795 (35 Geo. 3. c. 134)) Years of the Reign of his present Majesty for repairing the Highways from that Part of Counter's Bridge which lies in the Parish of Kensington, in the County of Middlesex, leading through the Towns of Brentford and Hounslow, to the Powder Mills in the Road to Staines, and to Cranford Bridge in the Road to Colnbrook, and several other Roads in the said County, so far as relates to the old District of Road described in the first of the said Acts. (Repealed by Metropolis Roads Act 1826 (7 Geo. 4. c. cxlii))
Road from Canterbury to Barham Act 1803 (repealed)	43 Geo. 3. c. xvii	24 March 1803
An Act for repealing an Act, made in the thirty-first Year of the Reign of his present Majesty, intituled, "An Act for making a new Road from Saint George's Gate in the City of Canterbury, to a Place called Gutteridge Bottom, and for repairing and widening the present Road from thence to the Dover Turnpike Road, in the Parish of Barham, in the County of Kent;" (Note: Kent Roads Act 1791 (31 Geo. 3. c. 94)) and for making further and better Provision for the several Purposes of the said Act. (Repealed by Road from Canterbury to Barham Act 1823 (4 Geo. 4. c. lvii))
Road from Glossop Act 1803 (repealed)	43 Geo. 3. c. xviii	24 March 1803
An Act for amending, widening, repairing, and improving the Road from or near to the Village of Glossop, in the County of Derby, to or near to Marple Bridge, in the said County; and for making several Branches of Roads to and from the same. (Repealed by Road from Glossop to Marple Bridge Act 1824 (5 Geo. 4. c. xxxv))
Road from the Edinburgh and Greenlaw Turnpike Road Act 1803 (repealed)	43 Geo. 3. c. xix	25 March 1803
An Act for repairing and maintaining the Road branching out of the Turnpike Road from Edinburgh to Greenlaw, and passing through or near Thornydike, Westruther, Hardlaw, Bedshiell or the Kaim, and Choicelee, to where it joins the Turnpike Road from Greenlaw to Dunse, all in the County of Berwick. (Repealed by Whiteburn and Choicelee Road (Berwick) Act 1825 (6 Geo. 4. c. xvi))
St. Giles-in-the-Fields Burial Ground and Chapel Act 1803	43 Geo. 3. c. xx	7 April 1803
An Act to provide a new Burial Ground, and erect a Chapel thereon, for the Parish of Saint Giles in the Fields, in the County of Middlesex.
Southampton Harbour Act 1803	43 Geo. 3. c. xxi	7 April 1803
An Act for abolishing certain Dues called Petty Customs, Anchorage, and Groundage, and for improving the Port of the Town of Southampton; for making a convenient Dock for the Security of Ships; for extending the Quays and Wharfs, and making Docks and Piers in the Harbour there; and for erecting Warehouses for the safe Custody of Goods and Merchandize; and for imposing certain Duties for the above Purposes.
Royal Canal (Dublin and Tarmonbury) Act 1803	43 Geo. 3. c. xxii	7 April 1803
An Act for altering and amending the several Laws (Note: Inland Navigation Act 1789 (29 Geo. 3. c. 33 (I))) (Note: Royal Canal Act 1790 (30 Geo. 3. c. 20 (I))) now in Force, for enabling The Royal Canal Company to complete a Navigable Canal from Dublin to Tarmonbury on the River Shannon.
Road from Chard Act 1803 (repealed)	43 Geo. 3. c. xxiii	7 April 1803
An Act for more effectually amending, widening, and keeping in Repair the Roads from the East End of the Town of Chard to the South End of West Moor, and from the West End of the Yeovil Turnpike Road through Illminster to Kenny Gate, and from the West End of Pease Marsh Lane to Horton Elm, and from Saint Rane Hill to Ilminster, and from White Cross to Chillington Down, and from a Place called Three Oaks, over Ilford Bridges, to Old Way, and from The Cross Keys to Catherine Wheel, in the Parish of Ashill, in the County of Somerset. (Repealed by Roads through Ilminster Act 1823 (4 Geo. 4. c. liii))
Road from Leeds to Wakefield Act 1803 (repealed)	43 Geo. 3. c. xxiv	7 April 1803
An Act for altering and enlarging the Powers of several Acts passed in the-thirty first Year of the Reign of his late Majesty, (Note: Leeds and Wakefield Road Act 1757 (31 Geo. 2. c. 63)) and in the tenth (Note: Leeds and Wakefield Road Act 1770 (10 Geo. 3. c. 61)) and thirty-second (Note: Leeds to Wakefield Road Act 1792 (32 Geo. 3. c. 131)) Years of the Reign of his present Majesty, so far as relates to the Road from Leeds to Wakefield, in the County of York. (Repealed by Road from Leeds to Wakefield Act 1821 (1 & 2 Geo. 4. c. v))
Dublin County Roads Act 1803	43 Geo. 3. c. xxv	7 April 1803
An Act to alter and amend an Act, made in the twenty-sixth Year of the Reign of his present Majesty, intituled, "An Act for making widening and repairing publick Roads in the County of Dublin and for repealing Parts of several Acts formerly made for that Purpose." (Note: County Dublin Roads Act 1786 (26 Geo. 3. c. 14 (I)))
Martock Roads Act 1803 (repealed)	43 Geo. 3. c. xxvi	7 April 1803
An Act for continuing the Term, and altering and enlarging the Powers of two several Acts, passed in the first (Note: Somerset Roads Act 1760 (1 Geo. 3. c. 29)) and twenty-third (Note: Somerset Roads Act 1783 (23 Geo. 3. c. 96)) Years of the Reign of his present Majesty, for repairing and widening the Roads from Dyed Way to Somerton, and from Gawbridge to Tintinbull Fords, and from a Stream of Water called Ford, to Cartgate, in Martock, in the County of Somerset; and also for repairing and widening the Roads from a Place called Hurst Bow in Martock aforesaid, through a Common Meadow called Petherton Broadmead, and thence through the Parishes of South Petherton, Shepton, Beauchamp, and Barrington, to join the Turnpike Road leading from Ilminster to Langport, and from South Petherton aforesaid, through Part of the several Parishes of South Petherton and Lopen, to Whitecross, in the said Parish of Lopen; all in the said County of Somerset. (Repealed by Somerton District of Roads (Somerset) Act 1823 (4 Geo. 4. c. lxii))
Roads from Modbury through Plymouth Act 1803 (repealed)	43 Geo. 3. c. xxvii	7 April 1803
An Act for continuing the Term, and altering and enlarging the Powers of two Acts, passed in the thirty-second Year of the Reign of his late Majesty, (Note: Devon Roads (No. 2) Act 1758 (32 Geo. 2. c. 68)) and the twenty-first Year of the Reign of his present Majesty, (Note: Devon Roads Act 1781 (21 Geo. 3. c. 84)) for repairing and widening the Road from Modbury through the Town of Plympton, to the North End of Lincotta Lane, in the County of Devon. (Repealed by Roads from Modbury through Plymouth Act 1823 (4 Geo. 4. c. cix))
Roads from Tamworth and from Harrington Bridge Act 1803 (repealed)	43 Geo. 3. c. xxviii	7 April 1803
An Act for continuing the Term, and altering and enlarging the Powers of two Acts, passed in the thirty-third Year of the Reign of his late Majesty, (Note: Leicester Roads Act 1759 (33 Geo. 2. c. 41)) and the twenty-first Year of the Reign of his present Majesty, (Note: Leicester Roads Act 1781 (21 Geo. 3. c. 89)) for amending, widening, and keeping in Repair the Roads from Tamworth to Ashby-de-la-Zouch in the County of Leicester, and from Sawley Ferry, now Harrington Bridge, in the said County, to a Turnpike Gate at or near the End of Swarcliffe Lane, to Ashby-de-la-Zouch aforesaid. (Repealed by Roads from Tamworth and from Harrington Bridge Act 1823 (4 Geo. 4. c. cxxii))
Garristown (County Dublin) Inclosure Act 1803	43 Geo. 3. c. xxix	7 April 1803
An Act for dividing, allotting, and inclosing the Commons, Commonable Lands, and Waste Grounds, within the Parish of Garristown, in the County of Dublin.
Carmarthen Roads Act 1803 (repealed)	43 Geo. 3. c. xxx	22 April 1803
An Act for continuing the Term, and altering and enlarging the Powers of Two several Acts, the One made and passed in the Third Year of the Reign of His present Majesty, intituled "An Act for repairing, widening and keeping in Repair the High Road leading from the Fourteenth Milestone, in the Parish of Mothvy, in the County of Carmarthen, through Llandovery to Llydad y Gwyn, in the Parish of Llandilovawr, and from thence by Cledfulch and over Duless Bridge to the Town of Llandilovawr, and from the said Town along the Post Road by Rhiwyradar, through the County of the Borough of Carmarthen and Village of Saint Clears, to Tavernspite in the Parish of Kiffig, at the Borders of the County of Pembroke;" (Note: Carmarthen and Pembroke Roads Act 1763 (3 Geo. 3. c. 34)) the other made and passed in the Twenty fourth Year of the Reign of His present Majesty, (Note: Carmarthen Roads Act 1783 (24 Geo. 3. Sess. 1. c. 33)) for continuing the Term and Powers of the said Act, and for repairing, amending and keeping in Repair several other Roads within the said County; for discharging the Trustees from the Care and Management of certain Parts of the said Roads; and for making, amending, altering, widening, improving and keeping in Repair, several other Roads within the said County. (Repealed by Main Trust Roads (Carmarthen) Act 1828 (9 Geo. 4. c. lxxvi))
Road from Camarthen to Newcastle Emlyn Act 1803 (repealed)	43 Geo. 3. c. xxxi	22 April 1803
An Act for making, amending, altering, widening, improving, and keeping in Repair, the Road leading from the North or North-West End of a certain Street called Lower Water Street, in the Town of Carmarthen, in the County of the Borough of Carmarthen, through the Village of Conwill Elvet, in the Parish of Conwill Elvet, and through the Village of Velindre Shinkin in the Parish of Penboir, to the Town of Newcastle Emlyn in the Parish of Cenarth, and several other Roads in the County of Carmarthen. (Repealed by Carmarthen and Newcastle Emlyn Road Act 1824 (5 Geo. 4. c. lxxxiv))
Southampton Waterworks Act 1803 (repealed)	43 Geo. 3. c. xxxii	17 May 1803
An Act to amend and render more effectual an Act made in the twentieth Year of the Reign of his late Majesty, (Note: Southampton Water Supply Act 1746 (20 Geo. 2. c. 15)) for repairing, improving, and maintaining, the publick Conduits and other Waterworks belonging to the Town of Southampton. (Repealed by Southampton Waterworks Act 1836 (6 & 7 Will. 4. c. xcvi))
Dunkeld Bridge and Roads Act 1803	43 Geo. 3. c. xxxiii	17 May 1803
An Act for enabling the Most Noble John Duke of Atholl and his Heirs to build a Bridge over the River Tay, at or near to the Town of Dunkeld in the County of Perth, and make Roads of Communication thereunto.
Roads in Edinburgh Act 1803	43 Geo. 3. c. xxxiv	17 May 1803
An Act for enlarging and altering the Powers of, and rendering more effectual, several Acts of the twenty-fourth (Note: Edinburgh and Leith Road Act 1750 (24 Geo. 2. c. 35)) and twenty-eighth (Note: Edinburgh Roads Act 1755 (28 Geo. 2. c. 39)) Years of his late Majesty, and of the fourth, (Note: Edinburgh and Linlighgow Roads Act 1764 (4 Geo. 3. c. 86)) twenty-fourth, (Note: Edinburgh Roads Act 1783 (24 Geo. 3. Sess. 1. c. 18)) twenty-fifth, (Note: Edinburgh (Streets) Act 1785 (25 Geo. 3. c. 28)) twenty-ninth, (Note: Edinburgh Roads Act 1789 (29 Geo. 3. c. 105)) and thirty-eighth (Note: Edinburgh County Roads and Bridges Act 1798 (38 Geo. 3. c. xlv)) Years of his present Majesty's Reign, for repairing the Turnpike and other High Roads in the County of Edinburgh.
Croydon, Merstham and Godstone Iron Railway Act 1803 (repealed)	43 Geo. 3. c. xxxv	17 May 1803
An Act for making and maintaining a Railway from or from near a Place called Pitlake Meadow, in the Town of Croydon to or near to the Town of Reigate, in the County of Surrey, with a Collateral Branch from the said Railway, at or near a Place called Merstham, in the Parish of Merstham, to or near to a Place called Godstone Green, in the Parish of Godstone, all in the said County of Surrey. (Repealed by Croydon, Merstham and Godstone Iron Railway Dissolution Act 1839 (2 & 3 Vict. c. lii))
Road from Glasgow to Yoker Bridge Act 1803 (repealed)	43 Geo. 3. c. xxxvi	17 May 1803
An Act for enlarging the Term and Powers of two Acts passed in the fourteenth (Note: Glasgow Roads (No. 2) Act 1774 (14 Geo. 3. c. 105)) and thirty-second (Note: Glasgow Roads Act 1792 (32 Geo. 3. c. 152)) Years of his present Majesty's Reign, for more effectually making and repairing the Road from the City of Glasgow to Yoker Bridge, and the Road of Communication between the same and the Canal from the Forth to the Clyde. (Repealed by Road from Glasgow to Yoker Bridge Act 1824 (5 Geo. 4. c. cxi))
King's Lynn Improvements and Markets Act 1803	43 Geo. 3. c. xxxvii	17 May 1803
An Act for paving, cleansing, lighting, watching, and improving the Borough of King's Lynn, in the County of Norfolk, and for removing Nuisances and Annoyances therein; and for holding the Saturday and Beast Markets within more convenient Parts of the said Borough.
Porthdinllaen and Nanthwynant Road Act 1803 (repealed)	43 Geo. 3. c. xxxviii	17 May 1803
An Act for amending, widening, improving, and keeping in Repair, the Road leading from the Port of Porthdinllaen, in the County of Caernarvon, to or near a Place called Caenant, in the County of Merioneth, and from Tan-y-Graig, in the Parish of Bodvean, to the Town of Pwllheli, and from thence to the Village of Llanyslymdwy, and from a Place called Cerrig-y-Rhwydwr, to or near to Capel Cerrig, in the said County of Caernarvon; and for building a Bridge across the River Aberglaslyn in the said Counties. (Repealed by Road from Porthdinllaen and other roads (Carnarvonshire) Act 1824 (5 Geo. 4. c. cxvi))
Sparrows Herne Road (Hertfordshire) Act 1803 (repealed)	43 Geo. 3. c. xxxix	17 May 1803
An Act to continue the Term, and alter and enlarge the Powers of two Acts, passed in the second (Note: Hertford and Bucks Roads Act 1762 (2 Geo. 3. c. 63)) and twenty-third (Note: Bushey Heath to Aylesbury Road Act 1783 (23 Geo. 3. c. 93)) Years of the Reign of his present Majesty, for amending the Road from the South End of Sparrow's Herne, on Bushey Heath, in the County of Hertford, to the Road at Walton, in the County of Buckingham. (Repealed by Sparrows Herne (Hertfordshire) and Walton (Buckinghamshire) Road Act 1823 (4 Geo. 4. c. lxiv))
Earl of Shrewsbury's Estate Act 1803	43 Geo. 3. c. xl	17 May 1803
An Act for vesting Part of the settled Estates of the Right Honourable Charles Earl of Shrewsbury, in the Counties of Salop, Chester, Berks, Wilts, and Oxford, in Trustees to be sold, and for laying out the Monies to arise by such Sale in the Purchase of other Lands and Hereditaments, to be settled in lieu thereof, to the same Uses, and subject to the same Restrictions.
Batty's Estate Act 1803	43 Geo. 3. c. xli	17 May 1803
An Act for enabling the High Court of Chancery to authorize and empower the surviving Devisee in Trust, named in the Will of Thomas Batty, heretofore of the Parish of Saint George in the East, in the County of Middlesex, Gentleman, deceased, to grant building Leases of certain Ground at or near Church Lane, in the Parish of Saint George in the East, in the County of Middlesex, devised to him by the said Will, and to sell and pull down an ancient Messuage, standing on Part of the said Ground, and to apply the Monies to arise by such Sale upon the Trusts of the said Will.
Stowe, Sturton and Bransby Inclosures Act 1803	43 Geo. 3. c. xlii	17 May 1803
An Act for dividing, allotting, and inclosing the Open and Common Fields, Ings, Meadows, Stinted Pastures, Moors, Commons, Wastes, and other uninclosed Lands and Grounds within the Township of Stowe, and the Hamlets of Sturton and Bransby in the Parish of Stowe, in the County of Lincoln.
Norton and Dronfield Inclosures Act 1803	43 Geo. 3. c. xliii	17 May 1803
An Act for dividing, allotting, and inclosing the several Commons and Waste Grounds within the Manor of Norton, in the Parishes of Norton and Dronfield, in the County of Derby.
Oldham Inclosure Act 1803	43 Geo. 3. c. xliv	17 May 1803
An Act for amending an Act, passed in the forty-second Year of the Reign of his present Majesty, intituled, "An Act for dividing, allotting, and inclosing the Commons and Waste Grounds within the Township of Oldham, in the Parish of Prestwich cum Oldham, in the County Palatine of Lancaster." (Note: Oldham Inclosure Act 1802 (42 Geo. 3. c. 59 Pr.))
Eyam Inclosure Act 1803	43 Geo. 3. c. xlv	17 May 1803
An Act for dividing and inclosing the several Commons and Waste Grounds within the Manor of Eyam, in the County of Derby.
Oakley Inclosure Act 1803	43 Geo. 3. c. xlvi	17 May 1803
An Act for dividing, allotting, and inclosing the Open and Common Fields, Common and Lammas Meadows, Commons and Waste Lands, within the Parish of Oakley, in the County of Bedford.
Chester Improvement Act 1803 (repealed)	43 Geo. 3. c. xlvii	27 May 1803
An Act to amend, alter, and enlarge the Powers of an Act, passed in the second Year of the Reign of his present Majesty, (Note: Chester (Poor Relief, etc.) Act 1762 (2 Geo. 3. c. 45)) so far as the same relates to maintaining a Nightly Watch, and lighting and cleansing the Streets, Rows, and Passages within the City of Chester and for preventing Nuisances and Annoyances in the Streets, Rows, and Passages within the said City, and for regulating and improving the Police thereof. (Repealed by Chester Improvement Act 1845 (8 & 9 Vict. c. xv))
Selby Bridge Act 1803 (repealed)	43 Geo. 3. c. xlviii	27 May 1803
An Act to amend and render more effectual an Act, passed in the thirty-first Year of the Reign of his present Majesty, (Note: Selby Bridge Act 1791 (31 Geo. 3. c. 60)) for building a Bridge over the River Ouse, from Selby in the West Riding of the County of York, to the opposite Shore, in the Parish of Heminborough in the East Riding of the same County. (Repealed by Statute Law (Repeals) Act 1993 (c. 50))
Loftsome Bridge over Derwent Act 1803	43 Geo. 3. c. xlix	27 May 1803
An Act for building a Bridge over the River Derwent, at or near Loftsome Ferry, from the Parish of Wressel to the opposite Shore in the Parish of Hemingbrough in the East Riding of the County of York.
Road from Toller Lane through Haworth and from the Two Laws Act 1803 (repealed)	43 Geo. 3. c. l	27 May 1803
An Act for continuing the Term and altering and enlarging the Powers of two Acts, passed in the twenty-eighth Year of King George the Second, (Note: Yorkshire Roads Act 1755 (28 Geo. 2. c. 50)) and twenty-first Year of his present Majesty, (Note: Yorkshire Roads Act 1781 (21 Geo. 3. c. 96)) for amending the Roads from the West End of Toller Lane near Bradford, through Haworth in the County of York, to a Place called Blue Bell, near Colne in the County of Lancaster, and from a Place called the Two Laws to Kighley in the said County of York. (Repealed by Roads from Toller Lane near Bradford and from the Two Laws Act 1823 (4 Geo. 4. c. xlviii))
Cocking End and Blacklane End Road Act 1803 (repealed)	43 Geo. 3. c. li	27 May 1803
An Act for continuing the Term, and altering and enlarging the Powers of two Acts, passed in the twenty-eighth Year of King George the Second, (Note: Yorkshire and Lancaster Roads Act 1755 (28 Geo. 2. c. 59)) and the twenty-first Year of his present Majesty, (Note: Addingham to Black Lane End Road Act 1781 (21 Geo. 3. c. 99)) for repairing the Road from Cocking End, near Addingham in the West Riding of the County of York, through Kildwick, to Black Lane End in the County Palatine of Lancaster. (Repealed by Blackburn, Addingham and Cocking End Road Act 1810 (50 Geo. 3. c. xxxvii))
Sandon Roads (Cheshire, Staffordshire) Act 1803 (repealed)	43 Geo. 3. c. lii	27 May 1803
An Act for continuing the Term and altering and enlarging the Powers of two Acts, passed in the second (Note: Stafford and Chester Roads Act 1762 (2 Geo. 3. c. 42)) and twenty-third (Note: Stafford and Chester Roads Act 1783 (23 Geo. 3. c. 99)) Years of the Reign of his present Majesty, for repairing, widening, and altering the Road from Sandon in the County of Stafford, to Bullock Smithy in the County of Chester, and from Hilderstone to Draycott in the Moors, and from Wetley Rocks to Tean in the said County of Stafford. (Repealed by Sandon Roads (Cheshire and Staffordshire) Act 1824 (5 Geo. 4. c. xxiv))
Horncastle Inclosure Act 1803	43 Geo. 3. c. liii	27 May 1803
An Act for dividing, allotting, and inclosing the Open and Common Fields, Meadows, Pastures, and other Commonable and Waste Lands within the Parish of Horncastle in the County of Lincoln.
Preston and Lancaster Road Act 1803	43 Geo. 3. c. liv	11 June 1803
An Act to continue the Term, and alter and enlarge the Powers of two Acts, made in the twenty-fourth Year of his late Majesty, (Note: Preston and Lancaster Road Act 1750 (24 Geo. 2. c. 20)) and the twenty-second Year of his present Majesty, (Note: Preston and Lancaster Road Act 1782 (22 Geo. 3. c. 88)) for repairing the Road from Preston to Lancaster, and from thence to a Place called Heiring Syke; (Note: Heron Syke is a stream near the border between Lancaster and Burton-in-Kendal.) and for maintaining and keeping in Repair the Road from the Guide Post in the Township of Slyne with Hest, (Note: Slyne-with-Hest, Lancashire.) to a Place called Hest Bank in the said Township.
Alloa Harbour and Town Improvement Act 1803	43 Geo. 3. c. lv	11 June 1803
An Act to amend an Act made in the twenty-sixth Year of the Reign of his present Majesty, (Note: Alloa Harbour Act 1786 (26 Geo. 3. c. 13)) for the Improvement of the Harbour of Alloa, for paving, cleansing, and lighting, the Town of Alloa, and for other Purposes therein mentioned.
Statute Labour in Kinross Act 1803	43 Geo. 3. c. lvi	11 June 1803
An Act for regulating and converting the Statute Labour in the County of Kinross, and for more effectually making and repairing the Highways within the said County.
Dysart Harbour Act 1803	43 Geo. 3. c. lvii	11 June 1803
An Act for repairing, improving, and preserving the Harbour of Dysart, in the County of Fife.
Kent Gaol and County Expenses Act 1803 (repealed)	43 Geo. 3. c. lviii	11 June 1803
An Act for repealing so much of an Act, made in the ninth Year of the Reign of King George the Second, intituled, "An Act to enable the Justices of the Peace, acting for the Western Division of the County of Kent, to purchase a convenient Piece of Ground for building a Gaol for the said County, and for empowering the said Justices to apply Part of the County Stock of the said Division towards the same," (Note: Maidstone Gaol, Kent (Expenses) Act 1735 (9 Geo. 2. c. 12)) as requires that the said Gaol should be repaired exclusively at the Expence of the said Western Division; and for the better Regulation and Payment of the publick Expences of the said County. (Repealed by County of Kent Act 1981 (c. xviii))
Worthing Improvement Act 1803 (repealed)	43 Geo. 3. c. lix	11 June 1803
An Act for paving, lighting, cleansing, watching, and improving, the Streets, Passages, and Places within the Town of Worthing, in the County of Sussex; for removing and preventing Annoyances and Obstructions therein, and for establishing an effective Police in the said Town. (Repealed by Worthing Improvement Act 1821 (1 & 2 Geo. 4. c. lix))
Sligo Town Government Act 1803	43 Geo. 3. c. lx	11 June 1803
An Act for repealing so much of an Act, made in the third Year of the Reign of King George the Second, intituled, "An Act for cleansing the Ports, Harbours, and Rivers of the City of Cork, and of the Towns of Galway, Sligo, Drogheda, and Belfast, and for erecting a Ballast Office in the said City, and each of the said Towns," (Note: Ballast Offices Act 1729 (3 Geo. 2. c. 21 (I))) as relates to the Port and Harbour of the Town of Sligo; and for repealing an Act made in the fortieth Year of the Reign of his present Majesty, intituled, "An Act for paving, cleansing, lighting, and improving the Streets, Quays, Lanes, and Passages in the Town of Sligo; in the County of Sligo for establishing a Nightly Watch in the said Town; for supplying the said Town with Pipe Water; and for improving and regulating the Port and Harbour thereof," (Note: Sligo Improvement Act 1800 (40 Geo. 3. c. 99 (I))) and for making better Provision for the paving, lighting, watching, cleansing, and improving of the said Town of Sligo; and for regulating the Porters and Carmen employed therein; and for the better Regulation and Improvement of the Port and Harbour thereof.
Dart, Teign and Plym Fisheries Act 1803 (repealed)	43 Geo. 3. c. lxi	11 June 1803
An Act to alter and amend two Acts, passed in the thirteenth Year of the Reign of King Edward the First, (Note: Salmon Preservation Act 1285 (13 Edw. 1. St. 1. c. 47)) and in the thirteenth Year of the Reign of King Richard the Second, (Note: Fish Act 1389 (13 Ric. 2. Stat. 1. c. 19)) for the Preservation of Salmon and other Fish in the Rivers Teign, Dart, and Plym in the County of Devon. (Repealed by Salmon Fishery Act 1861 (24 & 25 Vict. c. 109))
Dagenham Parish Church Act 1803	43 Geo. 3. c. lxii	11 June 1803
An Act for the more effectually repairing the Parish Church of Dagenham, in the County of Essex.
Road from Grampound Act 1803 (repealed)	43 Geo. 3. c. lxiii	11 June 1803
An Act for continuing the Term, and altering and enlarging the Powers of two Acts passed in the first (Note: Cornwall Roads Act 1760 (1 Geo. 3. c. 27)) and twenty-first (Note: Cornwall Roads (No. 2) Act 1781 (21 Geo. 3. c. 90)) Years of the Reign of his present Majesty, for repairing and widening the Road leading from the eastern End of the Borough of Grampound in the County of Cornwall, through the Towns of Saint Austell and Lostwithiel, and thence to the east End of the Western Tap House Lane in the said County. (Repealed by Grampound, St. Austell and Lostwithiel Road Act 1824 (5 Geo. 4. c. lxxxv))
Road from Worcester through Droitwich Act 1803 (repealed)	43 Geo. 3. c. lxiv	11 June 1803
An Act for continuing the Term, and altering and enlarging the Powers of an Act, made in the thirty-third Year of the Reign of his present Majesty, (Note: Worcester Roads Act 1793 (33 Geo. 3. c. 175)) for more effectually amending and keeping in Repair the Road from the City of Worcester, through Droitwich to Spadesbourne Bridge, within the Parish of Bromsgrove in the County of Worcester, and other Roads therein mentioned. (Repealed by Road from Worcester through Droitwich to Bromsgrove Act 1824 (5 Geo. 4. c. xxxiii))
Roads leading to Okehampton Act 1803 (repealed)	43 Geo. 3. c. lxv	11 June 1803
An Act for continuing the Term, and altering and en larging the Powers of two Acts, passed in the thirty-third Year of the Reign of his late Majesty, (Note: Okehampton Roads Act 1759 (33 Geo. 2. c. 36)) and in the twenty-second Year of the Reign of his present Majesty, (Note: Oakhampton Roads Act 1782 (22 Geo. 3. c. 92)) for repairing several Roads leading to the Town of Okehampton in the County of Devon. (Repealed by Okehampton Roads Act 1823 (4 Geo. 4. c. civ))
Road from Whitechapel Church (Middlesex) Act 1803 (repealed)	43 Geo. 3. c. lxvi	11 June 1803
An Act for continuing the Term, and altering and enlarging the Powers of an Act, passed in the twenty-fifth Year of the Reign of his present Majesty, (Note: Middlesex and Essex Roads Act 1785 (25 Geo. 3. c. 124)) for amending and keeping in Repair the Road from Whitechapel Church in the County of Middlesex to Shenfield, and the furthermost Part of the Parish of Woodford towards Epping, and from the Causeway in the Parish of Low Layton to the End of the said Parish of Woodford, next Chigwell, and through the Parishes of Chigwell and Lambourn, in the County of Essex; and for lighting and watching the said Road from Whitechapel Church, to the four Mile Stones in the Rumford and Woodford Roads. (Repealed by Middlesex and Essex Turnpike Roads Act 1823 (4 Geo. 4. c. cvi))
Arundel and Fittleworth Common Road Act 1803 (repealed)	43 Geo. 3. c. lxvii	11 June 1803
An Act for amending, widening, altering, and improving the Road leading from the High Street in the Town of Arundel, to the Junction of the Petworth and Pulborough Roads, and from thence to join the present Turnpike Road on Fittleworth Common, in the County of Sussex. (Repealed by Arundel and Fittleworth Common Road Act 1824 (5 Geo. 4. c. xvii))
Road from Islington to the Old Street Act 1803 (repealed)	43 Geo. 3. c. lxviii	11 June 1803
An Act for continuing the Term, and altering, and enlarging the Powers of two Acts, passed in the first (Note: London, City Road Act 1760 (1 Geo. 3. c. 26)) and twenty-third (Note: London City Road Act 1783 (23 Geo. 3. c. 102)) Years of the Reign of his present Majesty, for making a Road from the north east Side of the Goswell Street Road next Islington, and near to the Road called The New Road, over the Fields to Old Street, and from the Dog House Bar to the End of Chiswell Street, by the Artillery Ground, in the County of Middlesex. (Repealed by City Road Act 1824 (5 Geo. 4. c. lxi))
Road from Marsden to Gisburne (Lancashire, Yorkshire) Act 1803 (repealed)	43 Geo. 3. c. lxix	11 June 1803
An Act for amending, altering, and keeping in Repair the Road from the Turnpike Road between Burnley and Colne, in the Township of Marsden, in the Parish of Whalley, in the County Palatine of Lancaster, to the Town of Gisburn, in the West Riding of the County of York, and from thence to the Turnpike Road leading from Skipton to Settle, at or near the Town or Village of Long Preston, in the said County of York. (Repealed by Road from Marsden to Gisburne (Lancashire, Yorkshire, West Riding) Act 1824 (5 Geo. 4. c. iii))
Roads in Derbyshire and Yorkshire Act 1803 (repealed)	43 Geo. 3. c. lxx	11 June 1803
An Act to continue the Term, and alter and enlarge the Powers of an Act passed in the twenty-first Year of the Reign of his present Majesty, (Note: Derbyshire Roads (No. 2) Act 1781 (21 Geo. 3. c. 83)) for repairing the Roads from the present Turnpike Road upon Greenhill Moor to Hathersage, and from the Chesterfield Turnpike Road, near Stoney Middleton to Totley, all in the County of Derby; and also for making two new Branches from the said Roads to Baslow, in the said County, and to Goose Green near Sheffield in the County of York. (Repealed by Road from Greenhill Moor (Derbyshire) Act 1825 (6 Geo. 4. c. ci))
Road from Sacred Gate to Patrington Creek (Yorkshire) Act 1803 (repealed)	43 Geo. 3. c. lxxi	11 June 1803
An Act to continue the Term and enlarge the Powers of two Acts (Note: Yorkshire Roads Act 1760 (1 Geo. 3. c. 35)) (Note: Yorkshire Roads (No. 2) Act 1780 (20 Geo. 3. c. 89)) passed for amending the Road from Sacred Gate, in the Parish of Thorngumbald to Patrington Creek or Haven, and from the Guide Post in Winestead to Frodingham Gate, in or near Widow Branton's Farm, in the County of York. (Repealed by Road from Sacred Gate to Patrington Creek (Yorkshire) Act 1824 (5 Geo. 4. c. lxxxvi))
Whiteparish and Southampton Roads Act 1803 (repealed)	43 Geo. 3. c. lxxii	11 June 1803
An Act for continuing the Term, and altering the Powers of two Acts, made in the twenty-ninth Year of the Reign of his late Majesty King George the Second, (Note: Wiltshire and Southampton Roads Act 1756 (29 Geo. 2. c. 45)) and in the twenty-second Year of the Reign of his present Majesty, (Note: Wiltshire and Southampton Roads Act 1782 (22 Geo. 3. c. 110)) for repairing and widening the Roads leading from a Pond late belonging to Henry Eyre Esquire, in the Parish of Whiteparish in the County of Wilts, to the Top of Dunwood Hill, and from thence over Great Bridge and Middle Bridge, through Romsey Infra to Hundred Bridge in the County of Southampton, and from thence to the County of the Town of Southampton. (Repealed by Whiteparish, Romsey and Southampton Turnpike Roads Act 1824 (5 Geo. 4. c. lxxxiii))
Earl of Roden's Estate Act 1803	43 Geo. 3. c. lxxiii	11 June 1803
An Act for the Sale of Part of the Estates of the Right Honourable Robert Earl of Roden, for the Intent and Purposes therein mentioned, and for settling other Estates in lieu thereof to the same Uses.
Burtons Banks' Creditors' Relief Act 1803	43 Geo. 3. c. lxxiv	11 June 1803
An Act for the more effectually carrying into Execution the several Acts therein mentioned for the Relief of the Creditors of certain Banks lately kept in the City of Dublin called Burtons Banks.
Great Hucklow Inclosure Act 1803	43 Geo. 3. c. lxxv	11 June 1803
An Act for dividing, allotting, and inclosing, the several Open, Common, and Mesne Fields, Moors, Meadows, Pastures, Wastes, and other commonable and uninclosed Lands and Grounds, within the Township or Liberty of Great Hucklow, in the Parish of Hope, in the County of Derby.
Reagill Inclosure Act 1803	43 Geo. 3. c. lxxvi	11 June 1803
An Act for repealing an Act, passed in the seventh Year of the Reign of his present Majesty, (Note: Reagill Inclosure Act 1767 (7 Geo. 3. c. 89 Pr.)) for dividing and inclosing the Open Commons in the Manor of Reagill, in the County of Westmoreland, and for granting other Powers for dividing, allotting, and inclosing the said Lands and Grounds.
Sleagill Inclosure Act 1803	43 Geo. 3. c. lxxvii	11 June 1803
An Act for repealing an Act, passed in the nineteenth Year of the Reign of his present Majesty, intituled, "An Act for dividing and inclosing the Open Wastes and Commons lying in the Manor of Sleagill, in the County of Westmoreland;" (Note: Sleagill Inclosure Act 1779 (19 Geo. 3. c. 105 Pr.)) and for granting other Powers for dividing, allotting, and inclosing the said Lands and Grounds.
Somerleyton, Blundestone and Lound Inclosures Act 1803	43 Geo. 3. c. lxxviii	11 June 1803
An Act for dividing, allotting, and inclosing the Common Heaths, Marshes, Fens, and Waste Lands within the several Parishes of Somerleyton, Blundestone, and Lound, in the County of Suffolk.
Middleton Inclosure Act 1803	43 Geo. 3. c. lxxix	11 June 1803
An Act for dividing, allotting, and inclosing the Open and Common Fields, and Common Pasture, Common and Waste Lands within the Township of Middleton in the Parish of Middleton, in the East Riding of the County of York.
Clifford Inclosure Act 1803	43 Geo. 3. c. lxxx	11 June 1803
An Act for dividing and inclosing the several Open Fields, Commons, and Waste Grounds, within the Manor and Township of Clifford, in the West Riding of the County of York.
Wormhill Inclosure Act 1803	43 Geo. 3. c. lxxxi	11 June 1803
An Act for dividing, allotting, and inclosing the Commons, Commonable Lands, and Waste Grounds within the Liberty of Wormhill, in the Parish of Tideswell, in the County of Derby.
Alston and Garragill Inclosures Act 1803	43 Geo. 3. c. lxxxii	11 June 1803
An Act for dividing, allotting, inclosing, and otherwise improving several Commons, Moors, or Wastes within the Manor of Alston, otherwise Alston Moor and Garragill in the Parish of Alston and County of Cumberland.
Castle Bytham Inclosure Act 1803	43 Geo. 3. c. lxxxiii	11 June 1803
An Act for dividing, allotting, and inclosing the Open Common Fields, Meadows, Pastures, Wastes, and other Commonable Lands and Grounds within the Parish of Castle Bytham in the County of Lincoln.
Great and Little Kimble and Ellesborough Inclosures Act 1803	43 Geo. 3. c. lxxxiv	11 June 1803
An Act for dividing, allotting, and inclosing the Open and Common Fields, Common Meadows, Common Pastures, Commons, and Waste Lands within the Parishes of Great Kimble, Little Kimble, and Ellesborough in the County of Buckingham.
Lilstock Inclosure Act 1803	43 Geo. 3. c. lxxxv	11 June 1803
An Act for dividing, allotting, and inclosing the Open and Common Fields, Common Pastures, and Waste Grounds within the Parish of Lilstock in the County of Somerset.
Hartshill and Ansley Inclosures Act 1803	43 Geo. 3. c. lxxxvi	11 June 1803
An Act for dividing, allotting, and inclosing the Common and Waste Land, lying within the Manors of Hartshill and Ansley, in the Parishes of Mancetter and Ansley, in the County of Warwick.
Greenock Harbour Act 1803	43 Geo. 3. c. lxxxvii	24 June 1803
An Act for the further Improvement of the Harbours of the Town of Greenock, and for other Purposes therein mentioned.
Torquay Harbour Act 1803 (repealed)	43 Geo. 3. c. lxxxviii	24 June 1803
An Act for repairing, enlarging, and improving, the Pier and Quay within the Port or Harbour of Torquay in the County of Devon. (Repealed by Tor Bay Harbour Act 1970 (c. liii))
Sheerness Pier Act Amendment Act 1803	43 Geo. 3. c. lxxxix	24 June 1803
An Act for repealing so much of an Act, passed in the forty-first Year of his present Majesty, (Note: Sheerness Pier and Improvement Act 1801 (41 Geo. 3. (U.K.) c. liv)) for building a Pier at Sheerness in the Isle of Sheppy, in the County of Kent, and for other Purposes, as authorizes the taking or carrying away any Gravel, Stones, Ballast, Sand, or other Materials from the Sea Beach, belonging to William Alston, Lord of the Manor of Minster in the said Isle of Sheppy, without paying any Thing for the same.
Little Horton Improvement Act 1803 (repealed)	43 Geo. 3. c. xc	24 June 1803
An Act for paving, lighting, watching, and improving the Town of Bradford, and Part of the Hamlet of Little Horton adjoining thereto, in the County of York, and for removing and preventing all Nuisances therein. (Repealed by Bradford Improvement Act 1850 (13 & 14 Vict. c. lxxix))
Brighton Chapel of Ease Act 1803	43 Geo. 3. c. xci	24 June 1803
An Act to establish a Chapel of Ease at Brighthelmston (Note: Brighthelmston is now known as Brighton.) in the County of Sussex.
Harwell Road (Berkshire) Act 1803 (repealed)	43 Geo. 3. c. xcii	24 June 1803
An Act for amending, widening, improving, and keeping in Repair the Road leading from the London Turnpike Road near the South or upper End of Harwell Town in the Parish of Harwell, in the County of Berks, to the Turnpike Road near the Village of Streatley, in the said County. (Repealed by Harwell and Streatley Road (Berkshire) Act 1824 (5 Geo. 4. c. cxxxix))
Chester and Woodside Ferry Roads Act 1803 (repealed)	43 Geo. 3. c. xciii	24 June 1803
An Act to continue the Term, and alter and enlarge the Powers of an Act, passed in the twenty-seventh Year of the Reign of his present Majesty, (Note: Chester Roads Act 1787 (27 Geo. 3. c. 93)) for amending the Roads from the City of Chester to the Woodside Ferry in the County of Chester, and other Roads therein mentioned. (Repealed by Chester, Neston and Woodside Ferry District of Roads Act 1833 (3 & 4 Will. 4. c. xl))
Stafford, Nantwich and Chester Road Act 1803 (repealed)	43 Geo. 3. c. xciv	24 June 1803
An Act for continuing the Term, and enlarging the Powers of two Acts, passed in the ninth (Note: Stafford and Chester Roads Act 1769 (9 Geo. 3. c. 94)) and twenty-ninth (Note: Nantwich to Chester Road Act 1789 (29 Geo. 3. c. 91)) Years of the Reign of his present Majesty, for repairing certain Roads from the End of the County of Stafford through Nantwich to the City of Chester, so far as the said Acts relate to the first District of Roads. (Repealed by Stafford and Clotton Road Act 1824 (5 Geo. 4. c. xxxvi))
Haleworthy and Wadebridge Roads (Cornwall) Act 1803 (repealed)	43 Geo. 3. c. xcv	24 June 1803
An Act for further continuing the Term, and enlarging the Powers of an Act, made in the thirty-third Year of the Reign of his late Majesty King George the Second, (Note: Cornwall Roads Act 1759 (33 Geo. 2. c. 42)) for repairing and widening the Roads from Haleworthy in the Parish of Davidstow in the County of Cornwall, to the East End of Wadebridge, and from the West End of Wadebridge into and through the Borough of Mitchell in the said County. (Repealed by Road from Haleworthy to Wadebridge (Cornwall) Act 1825 (6 Geo. 4. c. xl))
Greenock to Kelly Bridge Road Act 1803	43 Geo. 3. c. xcvi	24 June 1803
An Act for making and repairing the Road from Greenock to Kelley Bridge in the County of Renfrew. and a Road branching out of the same to Ailly Miln, in the same County.
Earl Ferrers' Estate Act 1803	43 Geo. 3. c. xcvii	24 June 1803
An Act for vesting the Manor and Estate of Ratcliffe upon Wreke in the County of Leicester (Part of the settled Estates of Robert Earl Ferrers), in a Trustee to be sold, and for applying the Purchase Money in Discharge of an Incumbrance affecting the Whole of the said settled Estates.
Lord Southampton's Estate Act 1803	43 Geo. 3. c. xcviii	24 June 1803
An Act to confirm a Lease granted by the Trustees of a Power in a Settlement, made by the Right Honourable Charles late Lord Southampton deceased, and Ann Lady Southampton, to the Governor and Company of the New River, and for other Purposes.
Lowther and Lonsdale Estates Act 1803	43 Geo. 3. c. xcix	24 June 1803
An Act for effecting certain Exchanges between the Right Honourable William Viscount Lowther, and the respective Devisees under the Wills of Sir William Lowther Baronet, and the Right Honourable James late Earl of Lonsdale.
Langley's Estate Act 1803	43 Geo. 3. c. c	24 June 1803
An Act for vesting Part of the settled Estates of Richard Langley Esquire, in Trustees to be sold, subject to the Approbation of the Court of Chancery, and for applying Part of the Purchase Monies in paying off Incumbrances, and in reimbursing to him the Expences of Improvements already made, and also in reimbursing to him the Expences of future Improvements, when the Amount shall have been ascertained, under the Direction of the said Court, and for laying out the Residue of the Purchase Monies, under the Direction of that Court, in the Purchase of other Estates, to be settled to the former Uses.
Allerton Bywater Inclosure Act 1803	43 Geo. 3. c. ci	24 June 1803
An Act for dividing and inclosing the Common Fields, Common Ings, Commons, and Waste Grounds within the Manor of Allerton Bywater in the Parish of Kippax, in the West Riding of the County of York.
Potter Newton-cum-Gibton Inclosure Act 1803	43 Geo. 3. c. cii	24 June 1803
An Act for inclosing the Commonable Lands within the Manor and Township of Potter Newton cum Gibton in the Parish of Leeds, in the West Riding of the County of York.
Cumberland Inclosures Act 1803	43 Geo. 3. c. ciii	24 June 1803
An Act for dividing and inclosing the Commons and Waste Lands within the several Parishes of Penrith, Edenhall, Salkeld otherwise Great Salkeld, Lazonby, Heskett, Wetheral, Hutton, and Newton, the Township of Middlesceugh, and Braithwaite, in the Parish of Saint Mary Carlisle, and the Townships of Raughton and Gaitsgill, and Ivegill in the Parish of Dalston in the Honour of Penrith, and the Forest of Inglewood, or in one of them in the County of Cumberland.
Kirk Ireton and Callow Inclosures Act 1803	43 Geo. 3. c. civ	24 June 1803
An Act for inclosing Lands in the Townships of Kirk Ireton in the Parish of Kirk Ireton, and of Callow in the Parish of Wirksworth, in the County of Derby.
Hatton Inclosure Act 1803	43 Geo. 3. c. cv	24 June 1803
An Act for dividing, allotting, and inclosing the several Commons and Waste Lands in the Township of Hatton, in the Parish of Runcorn, in the County Palatine of Chester
London Skin Trade Act 1803 (repealed)	43 Geo. 3. c. cvi	4 July 1803
An Act to extend the Provisions of two Acts, passed in the thirty-ninth and fortieth, (Note: Use of Horse Hides, etc. Act 1800 (39 & 40 Geo. 3. c. 66)) and in the forty-first (Note: Damaging of Hides Act 1801 (41 Geo. 3. (U.K.) c. 53)) Years of the Reign of his present Majesty, relating to the Use of Horse Hides in making Boots and Shoes, and preventing the damaging of Raw Hides and Skins in the flaying thereof, to, and to alter and amend the same as to the Cities of London and Westminster, and Borough of Southwark, and Liberties thereof, and all Places within fifteen Miles of the Royal Exchange of the said City of London. (Repealed by Horse Hides Act 1824 (5 Geo. 4. c. 57))
Writers to the Signet Widows' Fund Act 1803 (repealed)	43 Geo. 3. c. cvii	4 July 1803
An Act for raising and securing a Fund for making Provision for the Widows of the Writers to his Majesty's Signet in Scotland. (Repealed by Statute Law (Repeals) Act 1998 (c. 43))
Dorset and Somerset Canal Act 1803	43 Geo. 3. c. cviii	4 July 1803
An Act for enabling the Company of Proprietors of the Dorset and Somerset Canal Navigation to raise a further Sum of Money towards completing the said Canal, and for altering and amending an Act passed in the thirty-sixth Year of the Reign of his present Majesty, (Note: Dorset and Wiltshire Canal Act 1796 (36 Geo. 3. c. 47)) for making and maintaining the said Navigation.
Road from Faversham and from Bacon's Water Act 1803 (repealed)	43 Geo. 3. c. cix	4 July 1803
An Act to continue the Term, and alter and enlarge the Powers of two Acts, (Note: Kent Roads (No. 2) Act 1762 (2 Geo. 3. c. 76)) (Note: Kent Roads (No. 2) Act 1782 (22 Geo. 3. c. 102)) passed for amending and widening the Road leading from the High Post Road near the Town of Faversham, to the Town and Port of Hythe, and from Bacon's Water to Holy Lane, in Wincheap, near the City of Canterbury in the County of Kent. (Repealed by Faversham, Hythe and Canterbury Roads Act 1824 (5 Geo. 4. c. lxii))
Road from Glasgow to Redburn Bridge Act 1803 (repealed)	43 Geo. 3. c. cx	4 July 1803
An Act for continuing the Term, and consolidating into one Act, several Acts relating to the Road from Glasgow to Redburn Bridge, and for making and repairing the Road therein mentioned. (Repealed by Road from Glasgow to Redburn Bridge Act 1804 (44 Geo. 3. c. lxv))
Road from Kingston-upon-Thames to Sheetbridge Act 1803 (repealed)	43 Geo. 3. c. cxi	4 July 1803
An Act for more effectually amending, widening, improving, and keeping in Repair, the Road leading from the Town of Kingston-upon-Thames in the County of Surrey, to a Place called Sheetbridge, near Petersfield, in the County of Southampton. (Repealed by Road from Kingston-upon-Thames to Sheetbridge Act 1823 (4 Geo. 4. c. lxxix))
Road from Bury (Huntingdonshire) to Stratton near Biggleswade Act 1803 (repealed)	43 Geo. 3. c. cxii	4 July 1803
An Act for enlarging the Term, and altering the Powers of two Acts, made in the twenty-eighth Year of the Reign of King George the Second, (Note: Bury and Stratton Road Act 1755 (28 Geo. 2. c. 35)) and in the nineteenth Year of the Reign of his present Majesty, (Note: Hunts Roads Act 1779 (19 Geo. 3. c. 86)) for repairing the Road from Bury in the County of Huntingdon, to a House called the Spread Eagle, in Stratton in the County of Bedford. (Repealed by Road from Bury (Huntingdonshire) to Stratton near Biggleswade Act 1819 (59 Geo. 3. c. xxv))
Agar's Estate Act 1803	43 Geo. 3. c. cxiii	4 July 1803
An Act for enabling Trustees therein named to concur, on the Part of the Devisees in the Will of Mary Foord, late of Stockton in the County of York, Widow, one of the three Sisters and Coheiresses of John Agar, late of Stockton aforesaid, Esquire, and Serjeant at Law, with the other Persons interested in making a Partition, by and with the Consent and Approbation of the Court of Chancery, of the Freehold and Copyhold Estates of the said John Agar.
Cornwall's Estate Act 1803	43 Geo. 3. c. cxiv	4 July 1803
An Act for effecting the Sale of the Mansion House and Grounds late of John Cornwall Esquire, deceased, situate in the Parish of Hendon, in the County of Middlesex, and for investing the Purchase Money, under the Direction of the Court of Chancery, in another Estate to be settled to the same Uses.
Whitwick, Thringstone and Pegg's Green Inclosure Act 1803	43 Geo. 3. c. cxv	4 July 1803
An Act for inclosing Lands in the Township of Whitwick, and Townships or Liberties of Thringstone and Pegg's Green, in the Parish of Whitwick in the County of Leicester.
Heversham Inclosure Act 1803	43 Geo. 3. c. cxvi	4 July 1803
An Act for dividing, allotting, and inclosing the Commons, Mosses, and Waste Grounds, within the Parish of Heversham, in the County of Westmorland.
Christchurch, Birmingham Act 1803 (repealed)	43 Geo. 3. c. cxvii	5 July 1803
An Act for erecting a new Church to be called Christ Church, in the Town of Birmingham, in the County of Warwick, and for providing a Maintenance and Residence for the Minister or Perpetual Curate thereof. (Repealed by Birmingham Churches Act 1897 (60 & 61 Vict. c. ccxi))
Wildmore Fen Drainage Act 1803	43 Geo. 3. c. cxviii	5 July 1803
An Act for amending an Act, passed in the forty-first Year of the Reign of his present Majesty, (Note: Wildmore and East and West Fens Drainage Act 1801 (41 Geo. 3. (U.K.) c. cxxxv)) for more effectually draining certain Tracts of Land called Wildmore Fen, and the West and East Fens in the County of Lincoln, and other Low Lands and Grounds lying contiguous or adjoining thereto.
Elland-cum-Greetland Inclosure Act 1803	43 Geo. 3. c. cxix	6 July 1803
An Act for inclosing Lands within the Manor and Township of Elland cum Greetland, in the Parish of Halifax, and West Riding of the County of York.
Lincoln Inclosures Act 1803	43 Geo. 3. c. cxx	7 July 1803
An Act for inclosing Lands in the Parishes of Saint Nicholas and Saint John in Newport, Saint Peter in Eastgate, Saint Mary le Wigford, Saint Martin and Saint Swithen, in the City of Lincoln, and in that Part of the Parish of Saint Margaret which lies within the said City, and for setting out and appropriating certain Lands within the said City, as a common Pasture for the Purposes therein mentioned.
Glasgow and Newark Improvement Act 1803 (repealed)	43 Geo. 3. c. cxxi	11 July 1803
An Act for explaining, amending, and enlarging the Powers of an Act, passed in the fifteenth Year of the Reign of his present Majesty, (Note: Port Glasgow (Improvement) Act 1775 (15 Geo. 3. c. 60)) so far as relates to supplying the Inhabitants of Port Glasgow and Newark with Water; to paving, cleansing, lighting, and watching the said Towns; and to repairing and keeping in Repair the Harbour of Port Glasgow; and for erecting a new Court House and Prison, and other necessary publick Buildings in the said Towns. (Repealed by Port Glasgow Police Act 1865 (28 & 29 Vict. c. ccliv))
Roads to and from Exeter Act 1803 (repealed)	43 Geo. 3. c. cxxii	11 July 1803
An Act for more effectually repairing and improving the several Roads leading to and from the City of Exeter, and for keeping in Repair Exeter Bridge and Countess Wear Bridge. (Repealed by Roads to and from Exeter Act 1815 (55 Geo. 3. c. xii))
Beam Heath in Alvaston Inclosure Act 1803 (repealed)	43 Geo. 3. c. cxxiii	11 July 1803
An Act for inclosing and improving a certain Tract of Common or Waste Land, called Beam Heath, in the Township of Alvaston, in the Parish of Nantwich, in the County Palatine of Chester. (Repealed by Beam Heath in Alvaston Inclosure Act 1823 (4 Geo. 4. c. 12 Pr.)
Port of London Improvement and City Canal Act 1803 (repealed)	43 Geo. 3. c. cxxiv	13 July 1803
An Act to authorize the Advancement of further Sums of Money out of the Consolidated Fund, to be applied in the Improvement of the Port of London, by the Mayor, Aldermen, and Commons of the City of London, in Common Council assembled; and to empower the Lords Commissioners of his Majesty's Treasury to purchase the legal Quays between London Bridge and the Tower of London. (Repealed by Thames Conservancy Act 1894 (57 & 58 Vict. c. clxxxvii))
Blackburn Markets and Improvement Act 1803 (repealed)	43 Geo. 3. c. cxxv	13 July 1803
An Act for regulating the Markets within the Town of Blakburn, in the County Palatine of Lancaster, and for improving the Streets and other Places within the said Town. (Repealed by Blackburn Improvements, Town Hall and Markets Act 1841 (4 & 5 Vict. c. cxii))
East India Docks Act 1803 (repealed)	43 Geo. 3. c. cxxvi	27 July 1803
An Act for the further Improvement of the Port of London, by making Docks and other Works at Blackwall, for the Accommodation of the East India Shipping in the said Port. (Repealed by East India Docks Act 1828 (9 Geo. 4. c. xcv))
Dublin Harbour, River and Bridges Act 1803 (repealed)	43 Geo. 3. c. cxxvii	27 July 1803
An Act for amending and rendering more effectual an Act, passed in the Parliament of Ireland, in the fortieth Year of the Reign of his present Majesty, (Note: City of Dublin (Improvement) Act 1800 (40 Geo. 3. c. 47 (I))) for promoting the Trade of Dublin, by rendering its Port and Harbour more commodious, and for repairing and preserving the Walls of the River Anna Liffey, in the City of Dublin; and also for empowering the Corporation for preserving and improving the Port of Dublin, to build and repair Bridges over the said River within certain Limits. (Repealed by Dublin Port and Docks Act 1869 (32 & 33 Vict. c. c))
Bedford Improvement and Ouse Bridge Act 1803 (repealed)	43 Geo. 3. c. cxxviii	27 July 1803
An Act for the Improvement of the Town of Bedford, in the County of Bedford, and for rebuilding the Bridge over the River Ouze, in the said Town. (Repealed by Statute Law (Repeals) Act 1995 (c. 44))
Severn Horse Towing-path Act 1803	43 Geo. 3. c. cxxix	27 July 1803
An Act for extending and making the Horse Towing Path or Road on the Banks of the River Severn, from Bewdley Bridge in the County of Worcester, to the deep Water at Dighs, below the City of Worcester.
Tavistock Canal Act 1803	43 Geo. 3. c. cxxx	27 July 1803
An Act for making and maintaining a navigable Canal from and out of the River Tamar, at or near Morwellham Quay, to the Town of Tavistock; and also a certain Collateral Cut to lead from the said Canal to Mill Hill Bridge, in the County of Devon.
Deptford Creek Bridge Act 1803	43 Geo. 3. c. cxxxi	27 July 1803
An Act for building a Bridge over the River Ravensborne, at or near its Mouth or Outlet into the River Thames, in the County of Kent, and for making and maintaining proper Approaches thereto.
Southwark and Bermondsey Roads Act 1803 (repealed)	43 Geo. 3. c. cxxxii	27 July 1803
An Act for enlarging a and altering the Term and Powers of several Acts of Parliament, (Note: Southwark Roads Act 1748 (22 Geo. 2. c. 31)) (Note: Southwark Roads Act 1766 (7 Geo. 3. c. 64)) (Note: Southwark Roads Act 1791 (31 Geo. 3. c. 110)) (Note: Bermondsey and Southwark Roads Act 1798 (38 Geo. 3. c. xxv)) for making a Road from New Street, Southwark, to the Places therein mentioned, and from Freeschool Street, Southwark, to Dock Head and Lilliput Hall Bridge, in Bermondsey, and from the Stones End in Kent Street, Southwark, to Dartford, so far as respects the Road leading from the Stones End in Bermondsey Street, towards Saint Thomas a Waterings; and also for repairing and maintaining a certain Lane, called Long Lane, in the Parish of Bermondsey, in the County of Surrey. (Repealed by London Government (Borough of Bermondsey) Order in Council 1901 (SR&O 1901/264))
Scartho and Louth Road Act 1803 (repealed)	43 Geo. 3. c. cxxxiii	27 July 1803
An Act for repairing, altering, and widening the Road from a Lane called Back Lane, in the Parish of Scartho, to Hollowgate Head, in the Parish of Louth, in the County of Lincoln. (Repealed by Scartho and Louth Road Act 1824 (5 Geo. 4. c. liv))
London Coal Trade Act 1803 (repealed)	43 Geo. 3. c. cxxxiv	27 July 1803
An Act for establishing a Free Market, in the City of London, for the Sale of Coals, and for preventing Frauds and Impositions in the Vend and Delivery of all Coals brought into the Port of London, within certain Places therein mentioned. (Repealed by London, Westminster, Middlesex, Surrey, Kent and Essex Coal Trade Act 1807 (47 Geo. 3 Sess. 2. c.lxviii))
Marquis of Downshire's Estate Act 1803	43 Geo. 3. c. cxxxv	27 July 1803
An Act for vesting the descended Estates of the most Honourable Wills late Marquis of Downshire, and Arthur late Marquis of Downshire, respectively deceased, in Trustees, in Trust, to be disposed of under the Directions of the High Court of Chancery, for Payment of their respective Debts.
Lord Stawell's Marriage Settlement Act 1803	43 Geo. 3. c. cxxxvi	27 July 1803
An Act for appointing new Trustees for the Purposes of certain Settlements made upon and after the Marriage of the Right Honourable Henry Lord Stawell with Mary Curzon Spinster, now the Right Honourable Mary Lady Stawell, and for other Purposes.
France's Estate Act 1803	43 Geo. 3. c. cxxxvii	27 July 1803
An Act for vesting certain Freehold and Leasehold Parcels of Land, and Materials of Building, situate in the Town of Liverpool, devised by the Will of the late James France Esquire, with their Appurtenances in certain Trustees upon Trust, to sell the same, and to lay out the Money arising from the Sale thereof in the Purchase of other Estates, to be settled to like Uses.
Batley Inclosure Act 1803	43 Geo. 3. c. cxxxviii	27 July 1803
An Act for inclosing Lands within the Manor and Township of Batley, in the West Riding of the County of York.
St. Pancras Improvement Act 1803 (repealed)	43 Geo. 3. c. cxxxix	29 July 1803
An Act to enlarge the Powers of, and explain and amend an Act made in the forty-first Year of the Reign of his present Majesty, intituled, "An Act for forming, paving, cleansing, lighting, watching, watering, and otherwise improving and keeping in Repair the Streets, Squares, and other publick Passages and Places, which are, and shall be made upon certain Pieces or Plots of Ground in the Parish of Saint Pancras, in the County of Middlesex, belonging to the Right Honourable Ann Dowager Baroness Southampton;" (Note: St. Pancras Improvement Act 1801 (41 Geo. 3. (U.K.) c. cxxxi)) and for including therein certain other small Plots of Ground in the said Parish therein described. (Repealed by London Government (Borough of St. Pancras) Order in Council 1901 (SR&O 1901/274))
Bristol Harbour Act 1803 (repealed)	43 Geo. 3. c. cxl	11 August 1803
An Act for improving and rendering more commodious the Port and Harbour of Bristol. (Repealed by Bristol Dock Company Act 1848 (11 & 12 Vict. c. xliii))
Leominster Canal Act 1803	43 Geo. 3. c. cxli	11 August 1803
An Act for enabling the Company of Proprietors of the Leominster Canal to raise Money to discharge their Debts, and to complete the Canal, and for explaining and amending the Acts for making and maintaining the said Canal, and for granting to the said Company further and other Powers.
Glasgow Theatre Act 1803	43 Geo. 3. c. cxlii	11 August 1803
An Act to enable his Majesty to grant Letters Patent for establishing a Theatre, (Note: Theatre Royal, Queen Street, Glasgow. The theatre opened in 1805, and burned down in 1829.) under certain Restrictions, in the City of Glasgow.
Church and Cemetery of the Parish of St. John at Hackney Act 1803	43 Geo. 3. c. cxliii	11 August 1803
An Act for altering and enlarging some of the Provisions of an Act passed in the thirty-fifth Year of his present Majesty's Reign, (Note: Saint John's Church, Hackney Act 1795 (35 Geo. 3. c. 70)) intituled, "An Act for amending an Act passed in the thirtieth Year of the Reign of his present Majesty, (Note: Saint John Church, Hackney Act 1790 (30 Geo. 3. c. 71)) intituled, 'An Act for taking down the Church and Tower belonging to the Parish of Saint John at Hackney in the County of Middlesex; and for building another Church and Tower for the Use of the said Parish, and for making an additional Cemetery or Church Yard;' and for raising a further Sum of Money for completing the said Church and other Works."
Beverstone Inclosure Act 1803	43 Geo. 3. c. cxliv	11 August 1803
An Act for inclosing Lands in the Parish of Beverstone, in the County of Gloucester.
Dewsbury Inclosure Act 1803	43 Geo. 3. c. cxlv	11 August 1803
An Act for inclosing Lands in the Manor, Rectory, or Rectory Manor and Township of Dewsbury, in the West Riding of the County of York.
Wroxton and Balscot Inclosure Act 1803	43 Geo. 3. c. cxlvi	11 August 1803
An Act for inclosing Lands within the Fields, Liberties, and Precincts of Wroxton and Balfoot, in the Parish of Wroxton, in the County of Oxford.
Doncaster Improvements Act 1803 (repealed)	43 Geo. 3. c. cxlvii	12 August 1803
An Act for repealing so much of an Act, passed in the Fourth Year of the Reign of His present Majesty, (Note: Doncaster Small Debts, Lighting, etc. Act 1763 (4 Geo. 3. c. 40)) as relates to the lighting the Streets and Places within the Borough and Soke of Doncaster, in the County of York; and for more effectually lighting, watching, and otherwise improving the said Borough, and for presenting Nuisances therein. (Repealed by Statute Law (Repeals) Act 1989 (c. 43))

=== Private acts ===
Short title	Citation	Royal assent
Long title
Bucklesham &c. Inclosure Act 1803	43 Geo. 3. c. 7 Pr.	24 March 1803
An act for dividing, allotting, and inclosing the heaths, plains, commons, and waste grounds, within the parishes of Bucklesham and Foxhall, in the county of Suffolk.
North Perrott Inclosure Act 1803	43 Geo. 3. c. 8 Pr.	24 March 1803
An act for dividing, allotting, and inclosing the open and common arable lands or fields, in the parish of North Perrott, in the county of Somerset.
Market Overton Inclosure Act 1803	43 Geo. 3. c. 9 Pr.	24 March 1803
An act for dividing, allotting, and inclosing the open and common fields, pastures, wastes, and other commonable lands, in the parish of Market Orton, otherwise Market Overton, in the county of Rutland, and for extinguishing the tythes within the same parish.
South Petherton Inclosure Act 1803	43 Geo. 3. c. 10 Pr.	24 March 1803
An act for dividing and allotting a certain common meadow, called Petherton Broadmead, situate in the parish of South Petherton, in the county of Somerset .
Northaw Inclosure Act 1803	43 Geo. 3. c. 11 Pr.	24 March 1803
An act for dividing, allotting, and inclosing, and otherwise improving the waste and commonable land within the parish of Northaw, in the county of Hertford.
Dalston Inclosure Act 1803	43 Geo. 3. c. 12 Pr.	24 March 1803
An act for dividing, allotting, and inclosing the moors, commons, and waste grounds, within the manor of Dalston, in the county of Cumberland.
Greffulhe's Naturalization Act 1803	43 Geo. 3. c. 13 Pr.	24 March 1803
An act for naturalizing John Lewis Greffulbe.
Schutze's Naturalization Act 1803	43 Geo. 3. c. 14 Pr.	24 March 1803
An act for naturalizing Charles Henry Ferdinand Schutze.
Beland's Naturalization Act 1803	43 Geo. 3. c. 15 Pr.	24 March 1803
An act for naturalizing John Frederick Lewis Beland.
Lutterloh's Naturalization Act 1803	43 Geo. 3. c. 16 Pr.	24 March 1803
An act for naturalizing John Henry Lutterloh.
North's Naturalization Act 1803	43 Geo. 3. c. 17 Pr.	24 March 1803
An act for naturalizing Louis Anna Cezar North and Claude Nicole du Pré de Saint Maur North, his wife.
Hellmers' Naturalization Act 1803	43 Geo. 3. c. 18 Pr.	24 March 1803
An act for naturalizing Frederick Adolphus Hellmers.
Seidensticker's Naturalization Act 1803	43 Geo. 3. c. 19 Pr.	24 March 1803
An act for naturalizing George Frederick Christian Seidensticker.
Kauffmann's Naturalization Act 1803	43 Geo. 3. c. 20 Pr.	24 March 1803
An act for naturalizing George Philip Kauffmann.
Bourcard's Naturalization Act 1803	43 Geo. 3. c. 21 Pr.	24 March 1803
An act for naturalizing John Rudolph Bourard.
Fagel's Naturalization Act 1803	43 Geo. 3. c. 22 Pr.	24 March 1803
An act for naturalizing Henry Fagel and William Henry James Fagel.
Rustington Inclosure Act 1803	43 Geo. 3. c. 23 Pr.	25 March 1803
An Act for dividing, allotting, and inclosing the Open and Common Fields in the Parish of Rustington, in the County of Sussex.
Robertson's Estate Act 1803	43 Geo. 3. c. 24 Pr.	7 April 1803
An Act to enable William Robertson Esquire, of Ladykirk, to exchange the Lands of Bandeath, Hill House Field, and Kirklands of Bolton, lying respectively in the Counties of Stirling, Mid Lothian, and East Lothian, held by him under certain Conditions, Provisions, and Limitations contained in a Disposition of the said Lands made by his Grandfather for the Lands of Ramrig and Greenside, belonging to him in Fee Simple, and lying in the County of Berwick.
Coker's Estate Act 1803	43 Geo. 3. c. 25 Pr.	7 April 1803
An Act for vesting Part of the Estates settled upon the Marriage of John Coker Esquire, with the Honourable Charlotte Marsham, in the said John Coker in Fee Simple, and for settling other Estates of greater Value in lieu thereof, and to the same Uses.
East Stower Inclosure Act 1803	43 Geo. 3. c. 26 Pr.	7 April 1803
An Act for dividing, allotting, and inclosing the Common and Waste Lands in the Parish of East Stower, otherwise Stower East Stower, in the County of Dorset.
Shelley Inclosure Act 1803	43 Geo. 3. c. 27 Pr.	7 April 1803
An Act for dividing, allotting, and inclosing a Piece or Parcel of Open and uninclosed Wood Land, called Hartley Bank; and also the several Commons, Moors, and Waste Grounds within the Manor of Shelley, in the Parish of Kirkburton, in the West Riding of the County of York.
Rippingale &c. Inclosure Act 1803	43 Geo. 3. c. 28 Pr.	7 April 1803
An Act for dividing, allotting, and inclosing the Open Common Fields, Meadows, Fen Wastes, and other Commonable Lands, within the Parishes of Rippingale and Kirkby Underwood, in the County of Lincoln.
Tollerton Inclosure Act 1803	43 Geo. 3. c. 29 Pr.	7 April 1803
An Act for dividing, allotting, and inclosing, the Open Common Fields, Meadows, Commonable Lands, and Waste Grounds within the Manor and Parish of Tollerton in the County of Nottingham.
Houghton Regis Inclosure Act 1803	43 Geo. 3. c. 30 Pr.	7 April 1803
An act to alter and amend an act, passed in the thirty-sixth year of the reign of his present Majesty, intituled, "An act for dividing and allotting the common and open fields, common meadows, commons, and waste lands, within the parish of Houghton Regis, in the county of Bedford;" (Note: Houghton Regis Inclosure Act 1796 (36 Geo. 3. c. 63 Pr.)) and to give powers for the making and completing of certain roads set out by the commissioners acting under and by virtue of the said act.
Burton &c. Inclosure Act 1803	43 Geo. 3. c. 31 Pr.	7 April 1803
An Act for dividing, allotting, and inclosing the Open Common Fields, Meadows, Pastures, and other Commonable Lands and Waste Grounds in the Township of Burton otherwise Burton upon Stather, and in the Hamlets of Stather, Darby, Thealby, and Coleby within the Parishes of Burton and West Halton, in the Wapentake of Manley, in the County of Lincoln, and for making a Compensation in lieu of the Tythes thereof, and of ancient inclosed Lands in the same Township and Hamlets.
Staverton &c. Inclosure Act 1803	43 Geo. 3. c. 32 Pr.	7 April 1803
An Act for dividing, allotting, and inclosing the Open Fields and Meadows, Commonable and intermixed Lands and Grounds, within the Parish of Staverton, with the Chapelry of Boddington annexed, in the County of Gloucester.
Close's Naturalization Act 1803	43 Geo. 3. c. 33 Pr.	7 April 1803
An Act for naturalizing Valentine Close.
Blewbury Inclosure Act 1803	43 Geo. 3. c. 34 Pr.	22 April 1803
An Act for dividing, allotting, laying in Severalty, and inclosing the Open Fields, Common Meadows, Common Pastures, Downs, and other Commonable Lands and Waste Ground, in Blewbery in the County of Berks.
West Rasen Inclosure Act 1803	43 Geo. 3. c. 35 Pr.	22 April 1803
An Act for dividing, allotting, inclosing and improving the Open and Common Fields, Meadows, Pastures, Ings, and other Commonable Lands and Waste Grounds, within the Parish of West Rasen in the County of Lincoln.
Sanders' Naturalization Act 1803	43 Geo. 3. c. 36 Pr.	22 April 1803
An Act for naturalizing Christian Saunders.
Jackson's Estate Act 1803	43 Geo. 3. c. 37 Pr.	17 May 1803
An Act for vesting, subject to the Approbation of the High Court of Chancery, the Estate settled to the Use of George Jackson and Elizabeth his Wife, and the Survivor of them, during their Lives, and the Life of the Survivor, with divers Remainders over, in George Benn and his Heirs, in Trust, for the said George Jackson and his Heirs, and for substituting other Lands and Hereditaments in lieu thereof.
Sibson Inclosure Act 1803	43 Geo. 3. c. 38 Pr.	17 May 1803
An Act for dividing, allotting, and inclosing the Open and Common Fields, Meadows, Commonable Lands, and Waste Grounds, within the Manor and Parish of Sibson, in the County of Leicester.
Send and Ripley Inclosure Act 1803	43 Geo. 3. c. 39 Pr.	17 May 1803
An Act for dividing, allotting, and inclosing the Open Common Meadows and Pastures, Commons, and Waste Lands, in the Parish of Send and Ripley, in the County of Surrey.
Beamish Inclosure Act 1803	43 Geo. 3. c. 40 Pr.	17 May 1803
An Act for dividing, allotting, and inclosing, a Moor or Common, and other Waste Lands, situate within the Manor of Beamish otherwise Beamish Park, in the Parish of Chester-le-Street, and County of Durham.
Barningham Inclosure Act 1803	43 Geo. 3. c. 41 Pr.	17 May 1803
An Act for dividing, allotting, and inclosing a certain stinted Pasture, called The Cow Close, in the Township of Barningham, in the North Riding of the County of York.
Dunham and Ragnall Inclosure Act 1803	43 Geo. 3. c. 42 Pr.	17 May 1803
An Act for dividing, allotting, and inclosing the several Open Arable Fields, Open Meadow, Common Pastures, Moors, Commons, and Waste Grounds, in the several Townships of Dunham and Ragnall, and within the Parish, Manor, and Soke of Dunham, in the County of Nottingham.
Harrow Inclosure Act 1803	43 Geo. 3. c. 43 Pr.	17 May 1803
An Act for dividing, allotting, and inclosing the Open and Common Fields, Commons, and Waste Grounds, within the Parish of Harrow, in the County of Middlesex.
West Chickerill Inclosure Act 1803	43 Geo. 3. c. 44 Pr.	17 May 1803
An Act for dividing, allotting, and inclosing the Commons, and Open and Common Fields, and other Commonable Lands and Places, within that Part of the Parish of Chickerill otherwise West Chickerill, which lies within the Tithing of West Chickerill, in the County of Dorset.
Chipping Lamborne Inclosure Act 1803	43 Geo. 3. c. 45 Pr.	17 May 1803
An Act for dividing, allotting, and laying in Severalty, and inclosing the Open and Common Arable Lands, Common Meadow, Common Pasture, Common Down, Waste and other Commonable Lands and Grounds, within the Township of Chipping Lamborne, in the Parish of Chipping Lamborne, in the County of Berks; and for dividing, alloting, and inclosing a certain Common, called King's Heath, within the Tithing of Blagrave, in the Parish of Chipping Lamborne aforesaid.
Boultham Inclosure Act 1803	43 Geo. 3. c. 46 Pr.	17 May 1803
An Act for dividing and inclosing certain Open Commons and Commonable Lands, within the Parish of Boultham otherwise Boltham, in the County of Lincoln.
Hanslope Inclosure Act 1803	43 Geo. 3. c. 47 Pr.	17 May 1803
An act for dividing, allotting, and inclosing the commons, and waste lands and grounds, within the manor and parish of Hanslop otherwise Hanslope, in the county of Buckingham.
Milton Erness Inclosure Act 1803	43 Geo. 3. c. 48 Pr.	17 May 1803
An Act for dividing, and inclosing the Open and Common Fields, Meadows, Lands, Commons, and Commonable Places, within the Parish of Milton Erness, in the County of Bedford.
De Severy's Naturalization Act 1803	43 Geo. 3. c. 49 Pr.	17 May 1803
An act for naturalizing William Benjamin Samuel Charriere de Severy.
Gall's Naturalization Act 1803	43 Geo. 3. c. 50 Pr.	17 May 1803
An act for naturalizing Lawrence Gall.
De Iongh's Naturalization Act 1803	43 Geo. 3. c. 51 Pr.	17 May 1803
An act for naturalizing Morice de Iongh.
Bradden Inclosure Act 1803	43 Geo. 3. c. 52 Pr.	27 May 1803
An Act for dividing and inclosing the Open and Common Fields, Meadows, Pastures, and other Commonable Lands and Grounds, within the Parish and Liberties of Bradden, in the County of Northampton.
Croydon Inclosure Act 1803	43 Geo. 3. c. 53 Pr.	27 May 1803
An Act for altering and amending the Powers of an Act, made in the thirty-seventh Year of the Reign of his present Majesty, intituled "An Act for dividing, allotting, and inclosing the Open and Common Fields, Common Meadows, Commons Marshes, Heaths, Wastes, and Commonable Woods, Lands, and Grounds, within the Parish of Croydon, in the County of Surrey." (Note: Croydon Inclosure Act 1797 (37 Geo. 3. c. 144 Pr.))
Cold Ashton Inclosure Act 1803	43 Geo. 3. c. 54 Pr.	27 May 1803
An Act for confirming and establishing the Division, Allotment, and Inclosure, of certain Commons called Freezing Hill and Nimlett, and also of a Piece of Open Pasture Land, Part of the said Common called Freezing Hill, lying in the Parish of Cold Ashton, in the County of Gloucester.
Dymoke's Estate Act 1803	43 Geo. 3. c. 55 Pr.	11 June 1803
An Act for vesting, subject to the Approbation of the High Court of Chancery, certain Messuages, Farms, Lands, and Hereditaments, situate in the Parishes of Great Hale otherwise Great Hall otherwise Great Hole, and Little Hale, in the County of Lincoln, Part of the settled Estates of the Honourable Lewis Dymoke, in Trustees, upon Trust to sell, and for laying out the Monies arising from such Sale in the Purchase of more convenient Estates, to be settled to the same Uses as the Lands so to be sold.
Stepney's Estate Act 1803	43 Geo. 3. c. 56 Pr.	11 June 1803
An Act for vesting in new Trustees, the Lands, Tenements, and Hereditaments, in the Counties of Cork, Westmeath, and in the King's County, in Ireland, formerly the Estate of George Stepney Esquire, deceased, which have not been sold or disposed of under and by virtue of an Act of Parliament, passed by the Parliament of Ireland, in the eleventh and twelfth Years of the Reign of his present Majesty, intituled "An Act for vesting Lands, Tenements, and Hereditaments, situate in the Counties of Limerick, Cork, Westmeath, and in the King's County, the Estate of George Stepney Esquire, in Trustees, in order that the same, or a competent Part thereof, may be sold for the Payment of Debts and Incumbrances affecting the same." (Note: Stepney's Estate Act 1771 (11 & 12 Geo. 3. c. 7 Pr. (I)))
Bishop of Bristol's Estate Act 1803	43 Geo. 3. c. 57 Pr.	11 June 1803
An Act for vesting Part of the Estates devised by the Will of Christopher late Lord Bishop of Bristol, in Trustees, to be sold, and for laying out the Money arising by such Sale in the Purchase of other Estates to be settled to the same Uses.
Earl of Shrewsbury's Hospital Exchange Act 1803	43 Geo. 3. c. 58 Pr.	11 June 1803
An Act for effectuating an Exchange, subject to the Approbation of the High Court of Chancery, of certain Estates situate in the Counties of Nottingham and Derby, between the Trustees of the Estates of the Hospital of Gilbert Earl of Shrewsbury, long since deceased, situate at Sheffield, in the County of York, and George Benson Strutt Esquire.
Froxfield Inclosure Act 1803	43 Geo. 3. c. 59 Pr.	11 June 1803
An Act for dividing, allotting, and inclosing a Common or Waste, called The Froxfield Barnett, and other Waste and Commonable Lands, in the Parish of Froxfield, in the County of Southampton.
Walton Inclosure Act 1803	43 Geo. 3. c. 60 Pr.	11 June 1803
An Act for dividing, allotting, and inclosing the several Commons and Waste Grounds within the Manor of Walton, in the Parish of Chesterfield, in the County of Derby.
Rushall Inclosure Act 1803	43 Geo. 3. c. 61 Pr.	11 June 1803
An Act for dividing, allotting, and inclosing divers Lands, lying in the Open and Common Fields, Common Meadows, and other Commonable Places, within the Manor and Parish of Rushall, in the County of Wilts.
Aslacton Inclosure Act 1803	43 Geo. 3. c. 62 Pr.	11 June 1803
An Act for dividing, allotting, and inclosing the Commons, Commonable Wood Grounds, and Waste Lands, within the Parish of Aslacton, in the County of Norfolk.
Shadwell Inclosure Act 1803	43 Geo. 3. c. 63 Pr.	11 June 1803
An Act for dividing and inclosing the Commons or Wastes, and other Commonable Lands, within the Manor and Township of Shadwell, in the Parish of Thorner, and West Riding of the County of York.
Kirkby-cum-Osgodby Inclosure Act 1803	43 Geo. 3. c. 64 Pr.	11 June 1803
An Act for dividing, allotting, and inclosing the Open and Common Fields, Meadows, Pastures, Moors, and other Commonable Lands and Waste Grounds, within the Parish of Kirkby cum Osgodby, in the County of Lincoln.
Burton Latimer Inclosure Act 1803	43 Geo. 3. c. 65 Pr.	11 June 1803
An Act for dividing, allotting, and inclosing the Open and Common Fields, and Common or Commonable Meadows, Pastures, Lands, and Grounds, and Common or Waste Land, within the Parish and Liberties of Burton Latimer, in the County of Northampton.
Edmondsham and Westworth (Dorset) Inclosure Act 1803	43 Geo. 3. c. 66 Pr.	11 June 1803
An Act for dividing, allotting, and inclosing the Downs, Commons, Commonable and Waste Lands, within the Manors of Edmondsham and Westworth, within the Parish of Edmondsham, in the County of Dorset.
Nythen Common in Alresford Inclosure Act 1803	43 Geo. 3. c. 67 Pr.	11 June 1803
An Act for dividing, allotting, and inclosing a Common called the Nythe otherwise the Nythen Common, in the Parish of Old Alresford, in the County of Southampton.
Worksop Inclosure Act 1803	43 Geo. 3. c. 68 Pr.	11 June 1803
An Act for dividing, allotting, and inclosing the several Commons and Waste Grounds, and all other the Open and uninclosed Lands and Grounds within the Parish of Worksop, in the County of Nottingham.
Whitwell and Hackford (Norfolk) Inclosure Act 1803	43 Geo. 3. c. 69 Pr.	11 June 1803
An Act for dividing, allotting and inclosing the several Open Fields, Commonable Meadow and Pasture Grounds, and certain of the Commons and Waste Lands, within the Parishes of Whitwell and Hackford, in the County of Norfolk.
Wilton &c. Inclosure Act 1803	43 Geo. 3. c. 70 Pr.	11 June 1803
An Act for dividing, allotting, and inclosing the Common Fields, Common Pastures, Commons, Moors, and Wastes, within the Townships of Wilton, Lazenby, Lackenby, and West Coatham, in the North Riding of the County of York.
Hemsworth Inclosure Act 1803	43 Geo. 3. c. 71 Pr.	11 June 1803
An Act for dividing, allotting, and inclosing the several Open Fields, Commons, and Waste Grounds, within the Parish of Hemsworth, in the West Riding of the County of York .
Little Comberton Inclosure Act 1803	43 Geo. 3. c. 72 Pr.	11 June 1803
An Act for dividing, allotting, and inclosing certain Open and Common Fields, Meadows, Commonable Lands and Waste Grounds, within the Parish of Little Comberton, in the County of Worcester.
Spetisbury Inclosure Act 1803	43 Geo. 3. c. 73 Pr.	11 June 1803
An Act for dividing, allotting, and inclosing the Open and Common Fields, Common Meadows, Common Pastures, Commons, Waste and other Commonable Lands and Grounds, within the Parish of Spetisbury, in the County of Dorset.
Yeadon Moor Inclosure Act 1803	43 Geo. 3. c. 74 Pr.	11 June 1803
An Act for dividing, allotting, and inclosing a Common or Moor, called Yeadon Moor, and other Waste Grounds, within the Manor and Township of Yeadon, in the Parish of Guiseley, in the West Riding of the County of York.
Upton Scudamore or Skidmore (Wiltshire) Inclosure Act 1803	43 Geo. 3. c. 75 Pr.	11 June 1803
An Act for dividing, inclosing, and allotting the Open and Common Fields, Downs, and Commonable and Waste Lands, in the Parish of Upton Scudamore otherwise Upton Skidmore, in the County of Wilts.
Markham's Divorce Act 1803	43 Geo. 3. c. 76 Pr.	11 June 1803
An Act to dissolve the Marriage of the Reverend Markham Dean of York, with Elizabeth Evelyn Sutton his now Wife, and to enable him to marry again, and for other Purposes therein mentioned.
Weston's Estate Act 1803	43 Geo. 3. c. 77 Pr.	24 June 1803
An Act for vesting detached Parts of the Estates devised by the Will of Mistress Melior Mary Weston, in Trustees, upon Trust, to sell the same, and to lay out a competent Part of the Money arising by such Sale in the Discharge of certain Incumbrances, and the Residue in the Purchase of other Estates, to be settled to the like Uses.
Blair's Estate Act 1803	43 Geo. 3. c. 78 Pr.	24 June 1803
An Act for settling and securing the Lands of Craigengate, and others, commonly called The Blair Adam Estate, and also the Lands of Dischandad or Dickendad, and others, lying in the Counties of Kinross and Fife, to and in Favour of William Adam of Blair Adam, Esquire, and the same Series of Heirs in Fee Tail, and under the same Conditions and Limitations as are contained in a Deed of Entail, made in the Year One thousand seven hundred and fifty-eight, by Alexander Littlejohn, of Woodstoun, deceased, of his real Estates, and in a Disposition of the same Date, of his Personal Estate; and for vesting in the aforesaid William Adam, and his Heirs and Assigns, in Fee Simple, the Lands of Hall Woodstoun, Hillend, Fisherhills, and others, lying in the County of Kincardine; and also the Balance or Residue of the Personal Estate of the said Alexander Littlejohn.
Kilmiston Inclosure Act 1803	43 Geo. 3. c. 79 Pr.	24 June 1803
An Act for dividing, allotting, and inclosing the several Open Common Fields, Meadows, Pastures, Commons, Downs, and other Waste Grounds, within the Manor and Township or District of Kilwiston, in the County of Southampton.
Ixworth and Thurston Inclosure Act 1803	43 Geo. 3. c. 80 Pr.	24 June 1803
An Act for dividing, allotting, and inclosing the Lammas Meadows, Commons, and Waste Grounds, within the Parish of Ixworth, in the County of Suffolk, and the Open and Common Fields, Heaths, Greens, or Commons and Waste Grounds, within the Parish of Thurston, in the same County.
Sutton-upon-Trent Inclosure Act 1803	43 Geo. 3. c. 81 Pr.	24 June 1803
An Act for dividing, allotting, regulating, and inclosing the Open Fields, Common Meadows, Pastures, and Waste Grounds, within the Parish of Sutton upon Trent, in the County of Nottingham.
Kinwarton Inclosure Act 1803	43 Geo. 3. c. 82 Pr.	24 June 1803
An Act for confirming and establishing the Division, Allotment, and Inclosure of certain Open and Common Fields, Meadows, and Pastures, and old inclosed Lands and Waste Grounds, in the Parish of Kinwarton, in the County of Warwick, and for making Compensation to the Rector of Kinwarton, in lieu of the Tithes thereof.
Saleby with Thoresthorpe (Lincolnshire) Inclosure Act 1803	43 Geo. 3. c. 83 Pr.	24 June 1803
An Act for dividing, allotting, and inclosing the Open and Common Fields, Meadows, Commonable Lands, and Waste Grounds, within the Parish of Saleby with Thoresthorpe, in the County of Lincoln.
East Hanney Inclosure Act 1803	43 Geo. 3. c. 84 Pr.	24 June 1803
An Act for dividing, allotting, laying in Severalty, and inclosing the Open and Common Arable Lands, Meadow, Pasture, Waste, and other Commonable Lands and Grounds, within the Hamlet of East Hanney, in the Parish of West Hanney, in the County of Berks.
Keysoe Inclosure Act 1803	43 Geo. 3. c. 85 Pr.	24 June 1803
An Act for inclosing Lands in the Parish of Keysoe, in the County of Bedford.
Lancing Inclosure Act 1803	43 Geo. 3. c. 86 Pr.	24 June 1803
An Act for inclosing Lands in the Parish of Lancing, in the County of Sussex.
Mickleton Inclosure Act 1803	43 Geo. 3. c. 87 Pr.	24 June 1803
An act for amending an act, passed in the forty-second year of his present Majesty, intituled, "An act for dividing, allotting, and inclosing, the moor or common open fields, stinted pastures, and other commonable lands, within the township of Mickleton, and parish of Romaldkirk, in the north riding of the county of York;" (Note: Mickleton and Romaldkirk Inclosures Act 1802 (42 Geo. 3. c. lxx)) and for making compensation for the tythes, and all payments in lieu of tythes, within the said township of Mickleton.
Werrington and Walton (Northamptonshire) Inclosure Act 1803	43 Geo. 3. c. 88 Pr.	24 June 1803
An Act for inclosing Lands in the Hamlets of Werrington and Walton, in the Parish of Paston, and County of Northampton.
Ganton, Potter Brompton, and Binnington (Yorkshire, East Riding) Inclosure Act 1803	43 Geo. 3. c. 89 Pr.	24 June 1803
An Act for dividing, allotting, and inclosing the Open Fields, Pastures, Cars, and other uninclosed Grounds, within the Townships of Ganton and Potter Brompton, in the Parish of Ganton, and the Township of Binnington, in the Parish of Willerby, in the East Riding of the County of York.
Wetwang and Fimber Inclosure Act 1803	43 Geo. 3. c. 90 Pr.	24 June 1803
An Act for inclosing Lands within the several Townships of Wetwang and Fimber, in the Parish of Wetwang, in the East Riding of the County of York.
Boehler's Naturalization Act 1803	43 Geo. 3. c. 91 Pr.	24 June 1803
An Act for naturalizing Balfar Boehler.
Hales's Estate Act 1803	43 Geo. 3. c. 92 Pr.	4 July 1803
An Act for vesting certain Messuages, Lands, and Hereditaments in the County of Kent and City of Canterbury, Part of the settled Estates of Sir Edward Hales Baronet, in Trustees, in Trust, to sell under the Directions of the High Court of Chancery, and to apply the Money arising thereby in Discharge of certain Incumbrances affecting the said settled Estates, and in reducing and repairing the Mansion House called Hales Place, being Part of the said settled Estates, and to lay out the ultimate Surplus of the Monies produced by such Sale in the Purchase of other Hereditaments, to be settled to the Uses of the remaining Part of the said settled Estates.
Brassington Inclosure Act 1803	43 Geo. 3. c. 93 Pr.	4 July 1803
An Act for dividing, allotting, and inclosing the Open Fields, Meadows, and Pastures, within the Township of Brassington otherwise Brasson, and the Commons and Waste Grounds, called Brassington, otherwise Brasson Common, in the Parish of Bradbourne, in the County of Derby.
Loseley and Polsted (Surrey) Inclosure Act 1803	43 Geo. 3. c. 94 Pr.	4 July 1803
An Act for inclosing that Part of the Common called The Pease Marsh, which lies within the Manor of Losely, in the Parishes of Saint Nicholas, in Guilford and Shalford, and within the Manor of Polsted, in the Parish of Compton, in the County of Surrey.
Waltham St. Lawrence and Hall (Berkshire) Inclosure Act 1803	43 Geo. 3. c. 95 Pr.	4 July 1803
An Act for inclosing Lands in the Precincts of the Manor of Waltham Saint Laurence; and also in so much of the Manor of Hall, as lies within the Parish of Waltham Saint Lawrence, in the County of Berks.
Alderbury Inclosure Act 1803	43 Geo. 3. c. 96 Pr.	4 July 1803
An Act for inclosing Lands in the Parish of Alderbury, in the County of Wilts.
Bourillion's Naturalization Act 1803	43 Geo. 3. c. 97 Pr.	4 July 1803
An Act for naturalizing Louis Bourillion.
Tinne's Naturalization Act 1803	43 Geo. 3. c. 98 Pr.	4 July 1803
An Act for naturalizing Matthew Tinne.
Godalming and Cattshull (Surrey) Inclosure Act 1803	43 Geo. 3. c. 99 Pr.	7 July 1803
An Act for inclosing the Commons within the Manors of Godalming and Cattshull, in the Parishes of Godalming, Chiddingfold, and Compton, in the County of Surrey.
Foote's Divorce Act 1803	43 Geo. 3. c. 100 Pr.	7 July 1803
An Act to dissolve the Marriage of Edward James Foote Esquire, with Nina Herries, his now Wife, and to enable him to marry again, and for other Purposes therein mentioned.
Charlton Adam &c. Inclosure Act 1803	43 Geo. 3. c. 101 Pr.	11 July 1803
An Act for inclofing Lands in the Parishes of Charlton Adam and Charlton Mackrell, in the County of Somerset.
Little Ormside Inclosure Act 1803	43 Geo. 3. c. 102 Pr.	13 July 1803
An Act for inclosing Commons in the Township of Little Ormside, in the County of Westmoreland.
Wokeing Inclosure Act 1803 or the Woking Inclosure Act 1803 or the Sutton Inclosure Act 1803	43 Geo. 3. c. 103 Pr.	13 July 1803
An Act for inclosing Lands in the Manor and Tything of Sutton, next Wokeing, in the Parish of Wokeing, in the County of Surrey.
Lyon's Estate Act 1803	43 Geo. 3. c. 104 Pr.	27 July 1803
An Act for enabling the Keepers and Governors of the Possessions, Revenues, and Goods of the Free Grammar School of John Lyon, within the Town of Harrow on the Hill, in the County of Middlesex, to grant Building Leases of certain of the Grounds and Estates of the said John Lyon.
Barmby-upon-Dunn Inclosure Act 1803	43 Geo. 3. c. 105 Pr.	27 July 1803
An Act for inclosing Lands in the Manor and Township of Barmby-upon-Dunn, in the Parish of Barmby-upon-Dunn, in the West Riding of the County of York.
Wantage Inclosure Act 1803	43 Geo. 3. c. 106 Pr.	27 July 1803
An Act for inclosing Lands in the Township of Wantage, and in the Hamlet of Grove, in the Parish of Wantage, in the County of Berks.
Chumasero's Naturalization Act 1803	43 Geo. 3. c. 107 Pr.	27 July 1803
An Act for naturalizing Isaac Mendez Chumasero.
Great Addington Inclosure Act 1803	43 Geo. 3. c. 108 Pr.	29 July 1803
An Act for inclosing Lands in the Parish of Great Addington, in the County of Northampton.
Quelle's Naturalization Act 1803	43 Geo. 3. c. 109 Pr.	29 July 1803
An Act for naturalizing Christopher Lebrecht Quelle.
Lord Hugh Seymour's Estate Act 1803	43 Geo. 3. c. 110 Pr.	11 August 1803
An Act for confirming and establishing an Exchange between the Right Honourable Hugh Seymour Conway, (Note: Lord Hugh Seymour.) deceased, commonly called Lord Hugh Seymour, and John Goldsmith, William Horn, Betty Cay, John Foster, Francis Foster, and George Foster, discharged as to the Lands conveyed to the Use of the said Lord Hugh Seymour, in Exchange of all the Limitations and Estates created by the Will of Thomas Land Gentleman, deceased, and for vesting in the Right Honourable George Henry Fitzroy, (Note: George FitzRoy, 4th Duke of Grafton.) commonly called Earl of Euston, the Right Honourable George Seymour, commonly called Lord George Seymour, (Note: Lord George Seymour.) and Thomas Asheton Smith Esquire, their Heirs and Assigns, upon the Trusts declared there of by a certain Indentured Release, all the Pieces or Parcels of Land and Hereditaments, which were conveyed to and to the Use of the said Lord Hugh Seymour, upon the said Exchange.
Aldridge's Estate Act 1803	43 Geo. 3. c. 111 Pr.	11 August 1803
An Act for enabling the Trustees of the settled Estates late of John Aldridge Esquire, deceased, in the County of Sussex, to carry into Execution a Contract entered into with Charles George Beauclerk Esquire, for the Sale of Part thereof, and for other Purposes therein mentioned.
Marten's Estate Act 1803	43 Geo. 3. c. 112 Pr.	11 August 1803
An Act for effectuating an Exchange of Lands belonging to the Trustees or the Charity of Sir Henry Marten Knight, and Henry Marten Esquire, for Lands belonging to Edward Loveden Loveden Esquire.
Wynch's Estate Act 1803	43 Geo. 3. c. 113 Pr.	11 August 1803
An Act for settling a certain Farm and Lands in the Parish of Llandow, in the County of Glamorgan, whereof George Wynch Esquire is seised in Fee Simple, in lieu of and Exchange for a certain Farm and Lands at Great Gonerby and Manthorpe in the County of Lincoln, being the settled Estate of the said George Wynch and Mary his Wife.
Parker's Estate Act 1803	43 Geo. 3. c. 114 Pr.	11 August 1803
An act for effecting the sale of an unsettled copyhold estate belonging to Ann Parker, Sarah Parker, and Samuel Mann infants, and to John Wray esquire, John Fea gentleman, and Molly Wray his wife, in undivided shares in fee simple, and for investing the purchase-monies of the infants' shares in other real estates, to be conveyed to the infants in fee simple, in lieu of such shares.
North's Estate Act 1803	43 Geo. 3. c. 115 Pr.	11 August 1803
An Act for vesting in the Honourable William Gordon, Assignee of Dudley North Esquire, a Leasehold Messuage, situate in Piccadilly in the County of Middlesex, with Part of the Fixtures and Furniture settled therewith, by a Codicil to the Will of Elizabeth Cavendish Widow, and for settling Part of the Estates of the said Dudley North in the County of Suffolk, in lieu of and in Exchange for the same.
Vancouver's &c. Exchange Act 1803	43 Geo. 3. c. 116 Pr.	11 August 1803
An Act for establishing and confirming Exchanges made between John Vancauver Esquire, and the Reverend Joseph Gunning Vicar of Sutton, in the County of Suffolk, and Mary Brand Widow, and John Brand Esquire deceased, of certain Lands in the Parish of Sutton in that County.
Chedworth Inclosure Act 1803	43 Geo. 3. c. 117 Pr.	11 August 1803
An Act for inclosing Lands in the Manors and Parishes of Chedworth and Compton Abdale in the County of Gloucester.
Fenditton Inclosure Act 1803	43 Geo. 3. c. 118 Pr.	11 August 1803
An Act for inclosing Lands in the Parish of Fenditton, in the County of Cambridge.
Northnewton Inclosure Act 1803	43 Geo. 3. c. 119 Pr.	11 August 1803
An Act for inclosing Lands in Northnewton otherwise Nortonewington in the Parish of Broughton in the County of Oxford.
Worplesdon Inclosure Act 1803	43 Geo. 3. c. 120 Pr.	11 August 1803
An act for inclosing lands in the parishes of Worplesdon and Wanburow, and in the manor of Wanborow, in the parishes of Ash and Puttenham in the county of Surrey.

=== Sources ===
- Pickering, Danby, ed. (1804). The Statutes at Large. Vol. 44, Part 1. 43 George III. 1802-3. Cambridge: Cambridge University Press – via HathiTrust.
- "43° George III.". The Statutes of the United Kingdom of Great Britain and Ireland. Vol. The First. From A.D. 1801, 41 George III.—To AD 1803, 43 George III. London: Eyre and Strahan. 1804. pp. 657–1239 – via Google Books.
- "43° George III.". The Statutes of the United Kingdom of Great Britain and Ireland. Vol. The First. From A.D. 1801, 41 George III.—To AD 1803, 43 George III. London: Eyre and Strahan. 1804. pp. 657–1239 – via HathiTrust.
- Journal of the House of Commons. Vol. 58. London: His Majesty's Stationery Office. pp. 7–694 – via Google Books.
- Chronological Table of and Index to the Statutes. Vol. 1: To the End of the Session 59 Vict. Sess. 2 (1895) (13th ed.). London: Her Majesty's Stationery Office. 1896. pp. 174–178 – via Google Books.
- "Statutes of the United Kingdom of Great Britain and Ireland, 1803". Irish Statute Book. Office of the Attorney General, Government of Ireland.

== See also ==
- List of acts of the Parliament of the United Kingdom
