= Defence of the Realm (disambiguation) =

Defence of the Realm might refer to:

- Defence of the Realm, a 1985 political thriller film
- Defence of the Realm, a 1996 documentary about the workings of the British Armed Forces under the MoD
- The Defence of the Realm, a 2009 history of MI5 by Christopher Andrew
- Defence of the Realm Act 1803, an act of the United Kingdom parliament
- Defence of the Realm Act 1914, an act of the United Kingdom parliament
- Defence of the Realm Act 1915, an act of the United Kingdom parliament
