= History of Alnmouth =

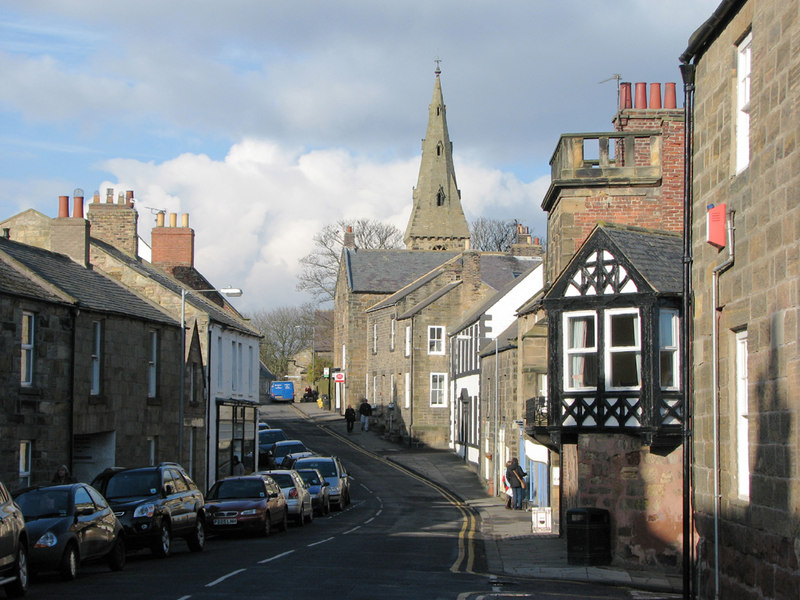
Northumberland Street, the spine road of Alnmouth, dating back to the 12th century

The history of Alnmouth, a village and seaport in Northumberland, England, can be traced back to the Mesolithic period. Its modern history starts with the establishment of a settlement in 1152 and a charter for a port and market in 1207/8. Fragmentary evidence of occupation or use in earlier periods has been found. The port's peak period was in the 18th & 19th centuries. From the late 19th century and in the 20th century the village became a coastal resort.

== Establishment ==
Alnmouth was established as a village by William de Vesci, the then local Norman magnate who was granted a charter in 1152 to hold court and establish a settlement on a 296 acres (120 ha) spit of land in the manor of Lesbury, presumably to establish a viable seaport. The plan of Alnmouth follows a conventional medieval pattern of a road – now Northumberland Street – with long thin burgage plots running at right-angles to it.

== Prehistory ==
What preceded the Norman village is less clear, although land at the mouth of the river is likely to have been used throughout antiquity, coastal plains being some of the first areas of recorded human settlement in Britain. A few flint tools from the Mesolithic period, before 4000 BCE, have been found on a beach above Alnmouth – the sea level was higher in that period – and there is known to have been a major Mesolithic camp at Howick, a few miles up the coast. No evidence has been found for the Neolithic period, but the expectation is that the area continued to be populated or used. A number of Bronze Age remains have been found in the vicinity of Alnmouth, including cist burials and a spear-head. The naming of a field suggests a lost barrow. An enclosure bank earthwork to the north of the town, and now part of the golf course, has been attributed to the Iron Age.

== Roman period ==
No Roman remains have been discovered in or around the village, but it appears likely that the estuary was known and presumably used by the Romans, perhaps when the empire extended to the Antonine Wall between the Firths of Forth and Clyde. Ptolemy, writing in the 2nd century CE notes the river Alaunus, and the much later Ravenna Cosmography notes a place-name of Alauna. A substantial Roman fort, Alauna, was established over an 11 acres (4.5 ha) site, 9.5 miles (15.3 km) upstream on the Aln at Learchild near Whittingham. The harbour provided by the river would have been useful to the Romans, both to support military campaigns and to facilitate trade, albeit the river is not navigable beyond Lesbury, 3.2 kilometres (2.0 mi) upstream.

== Early Christianity ==
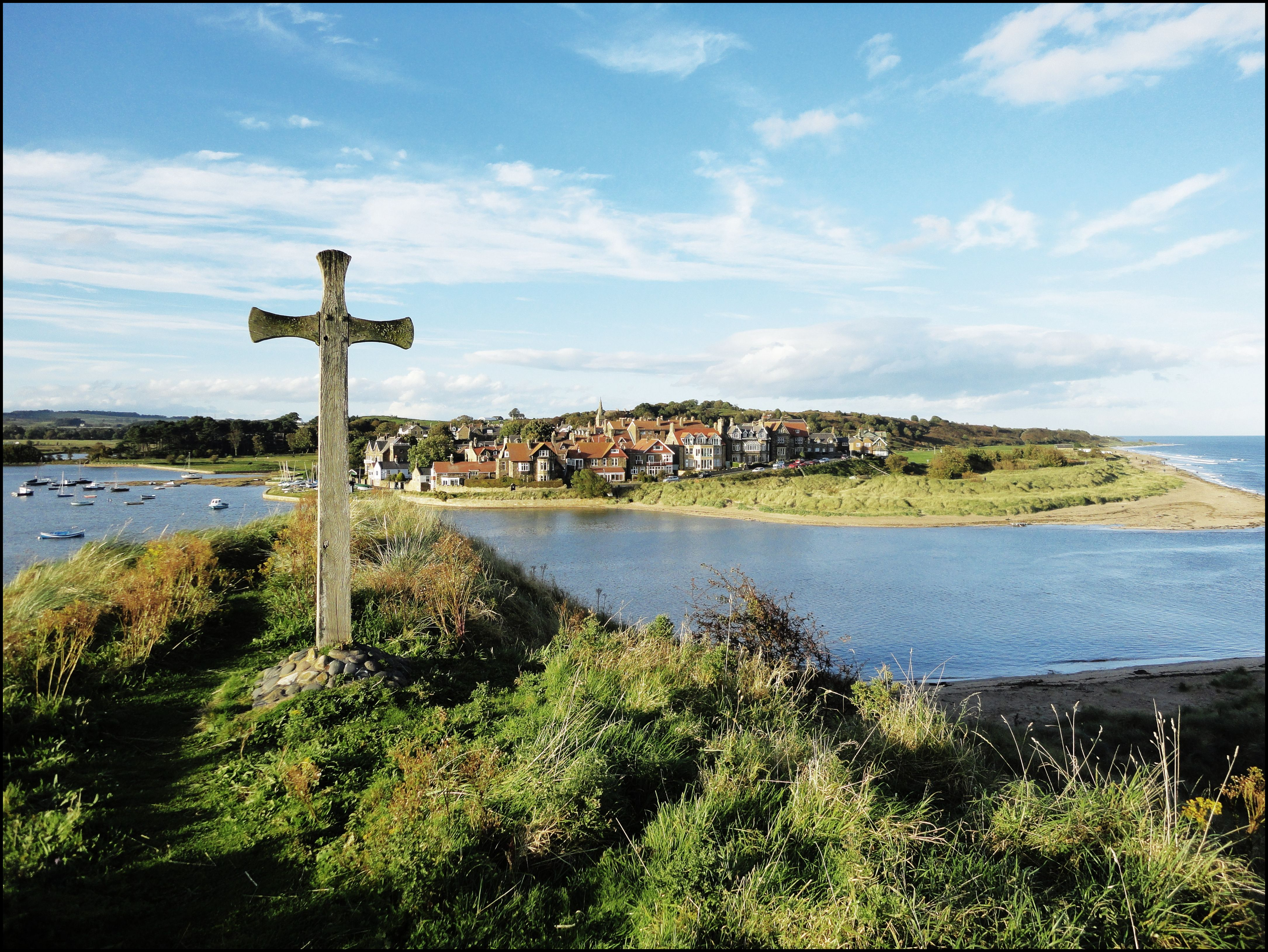
Contemporary wooden cross on Church Hill, now separated from the village

The Northumberland Coast has a long association with early Christianity. Adtwifyrdi or Adtuifyrdi ("at the two fords") is the name used by the Venerable Bede, and is believed to refer to the confluence of the River Aln at its mouth with a tributary. Here, according to Bede's account in Historia ecclesiastica gentis Anglorum, Book IV, ch. 28, Archbishop Theodore presided over a synod in 684 in the presence of King Ecgfrith of Northumbria, at which bishop Tunberht of Hexham was deposed and St Cuthbert elected Bishop of Lindisfarne. A 9th or 10th century cross found on Church Hill, to the south of the village, lends credence to the idea that the area had a role in pre-conquest Britain.

There is evidence suggesting the formation of a monastery at Alnmouth, in the form of records of Eustace fitz John granting land to the monks of Alnwick Abbey in 1147. A church of St Waleric at Alnmouth is known from court records to have existed by 1305, although its precise location on Church Hill is uncertain, and it is known to have been in ruins by 1771, when it was illustrated as a roofless Romanesque and Gothic style building with nave, aisle, transept and a small porch. (Note: Ruins still standing on Church Hill are of a mortuary chapel constructed in 1870.)

== Establishment of the port ==
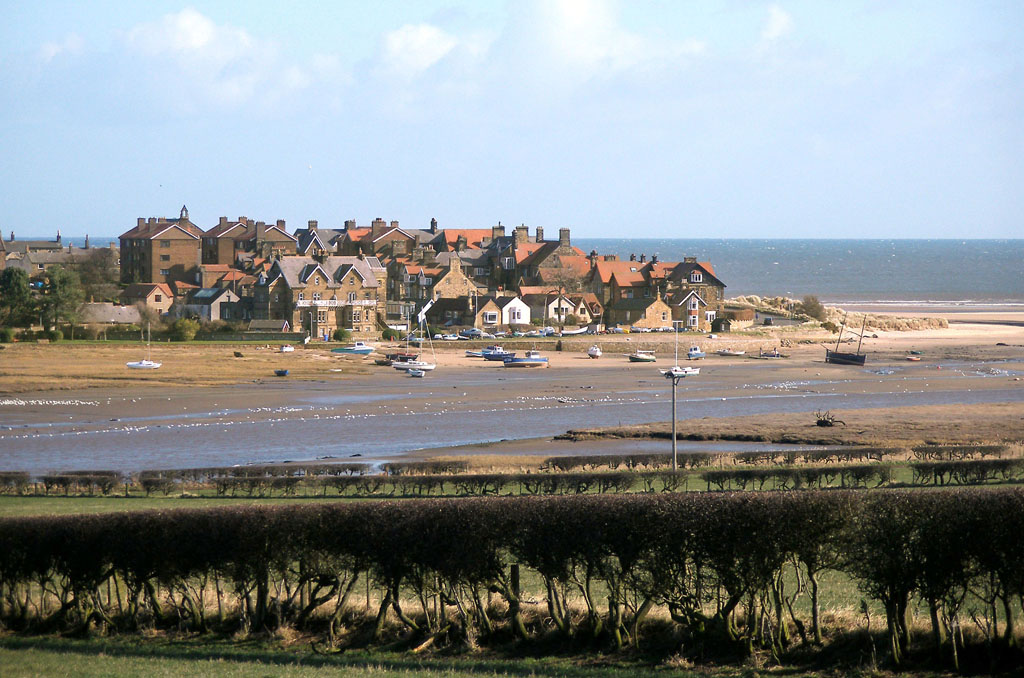
Alnmouth port, amounting to a riverside beach sheltered from the North Sea

Alnmouth's port has had a fitful 800-year documented history. Eustace de Vesci was granted royal permission to establish a port and a Wednesday fish market in 1207 or 1208. Although clearly associated with a nascent fishing industry, the port also engaged in local and foreign trade. Richard de Emeldon, a burgage holder of the village, is recorded as having developed the harbour, and Alnmouth is shown to be a port of call by a Crown request for the supply of a boat to assist in a military campaign to Gascony in 1306. No archaeological remains of the port from this time are known, and there was probably little infrastructure beyond mooring posts, and possibly wooden jetties. The topography of the river and mudflats would provide a sheltered beaching-point for vessels.

Alnmouth was attacked and greatly depleted by the Scots in 1336: in 1296, twenty-eight people had been listed as being liable to pay tax; in 1336 this fell to just one. Further depredations were caused by the Black Death in 1348; and Border Reiving was an ever-present threat. The port was annexed to Alnwick Castle in 1452, and by 1492 records show the village had recovered its former position with a large number of burgesses. In 1529, the burgesses entered into an agreement with the Earl of Northumberland to improve the harbour if he would supply the wood.

== 15th and 16th century stagnation ==
The village declined in the 15th and 16th centuries: the Earl of Northumberland recorded in 1594 that the village was "depeopled". A 1614 survey notes that the village was "in great ruin and decay", albeit somewhat improved. A 1567 survey established that 20 of the 60 households in Alnmouth were engaged in fishing – the rights to which were handed to the Duke of Northumberland after the Dissolution of the Monasteries.

According to two sources, including the Encyclopædia Metropolitana, Alnmouth was taken and fortified by the French during the reign of Queen Elizabeth I, in support of the claims of Mary, Queen of Scots. The Schooner Hotel was built in the 1600s and is reported in the local newspaper, the Northumberland Gazette, to be one of the most haunted locations in the United Kingdom. Contemporary sources are silent on the assertion.

== 17th and 18th century prosperity ==
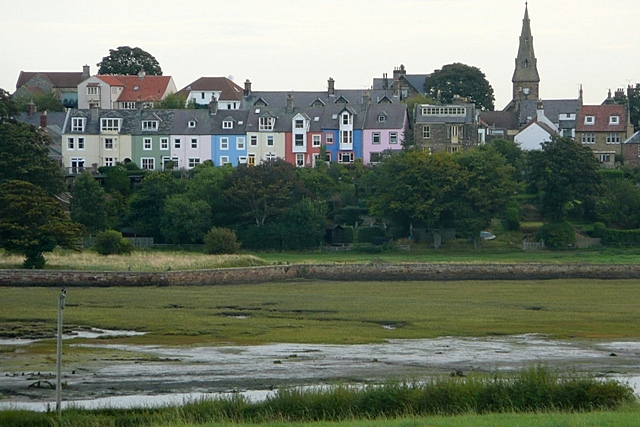
Terrace of painted houses overlooking the harbour

Prosperity seems to have improved in the 17th century, and in the 18th century trade at the port burgeoned (as was common for many ports in that period, owing to greatly increasing foreign and domestic trade). The most notable export from the port was grain, and records speak of a "corn road" to Alnmouth from as far away as Hexham. In 1813 – not necessarily at Alnmouth's peak, since trade suffered during the war with France – Alnmouth exported 44,266 quarters (Note: There is uncertainty as to exactly what volume or weight is represented in the records by the Quarter unit) of grain, about half as much as Berwick-upon-Tweed, but twice as much as Newcastle. Such an amount might be harvested from about 9,000 acres (3,600 ha) of fields and so it may be questionable how far grain travelled to be exported. A major import of the time was guano from Peru, part of the larger pattern of agricultural improvement of the time; a guano shed still exists at the south of Church Hill, built well away from the village, presumably because of the stench. Other exports noted in this period are coal, and eggs, pork and pickled salmon for the London trade, and wool for the Yorkshire woolen industry. Imports mentioned include blue slate from Scotland, timber from Holland and Scandinavia, and occasionally, pipes of Madeira wine. The grain trade gave rise to 16 granaries in the village, some of which were much later converted to residential use.

The port also prospered as a shipbuilding centre, albeit on a modest scale. A 300-ton ship was launched in 1763 (or 1765 – sources differ) and a second 219-ton ship, the Providence, is recorded as being launched in 1765. That industry supported others, such as a sawmill and a ropery. There is evidence of salt-making by the river, and at least five oyster-beds were established.

At its peak, around 1750, up to 18 vessels might be seen in the harbour at any one time. The reputation of the village was not high, though. John Wesley is famously reported to have described the place as "a small sea-port town, famous for all kinds of wickedness", and much earlier accounts speak of members of the community who added nothing to the commonwealth, and against whom all things must be secured lest they be stolen.

== Decline of the port ==
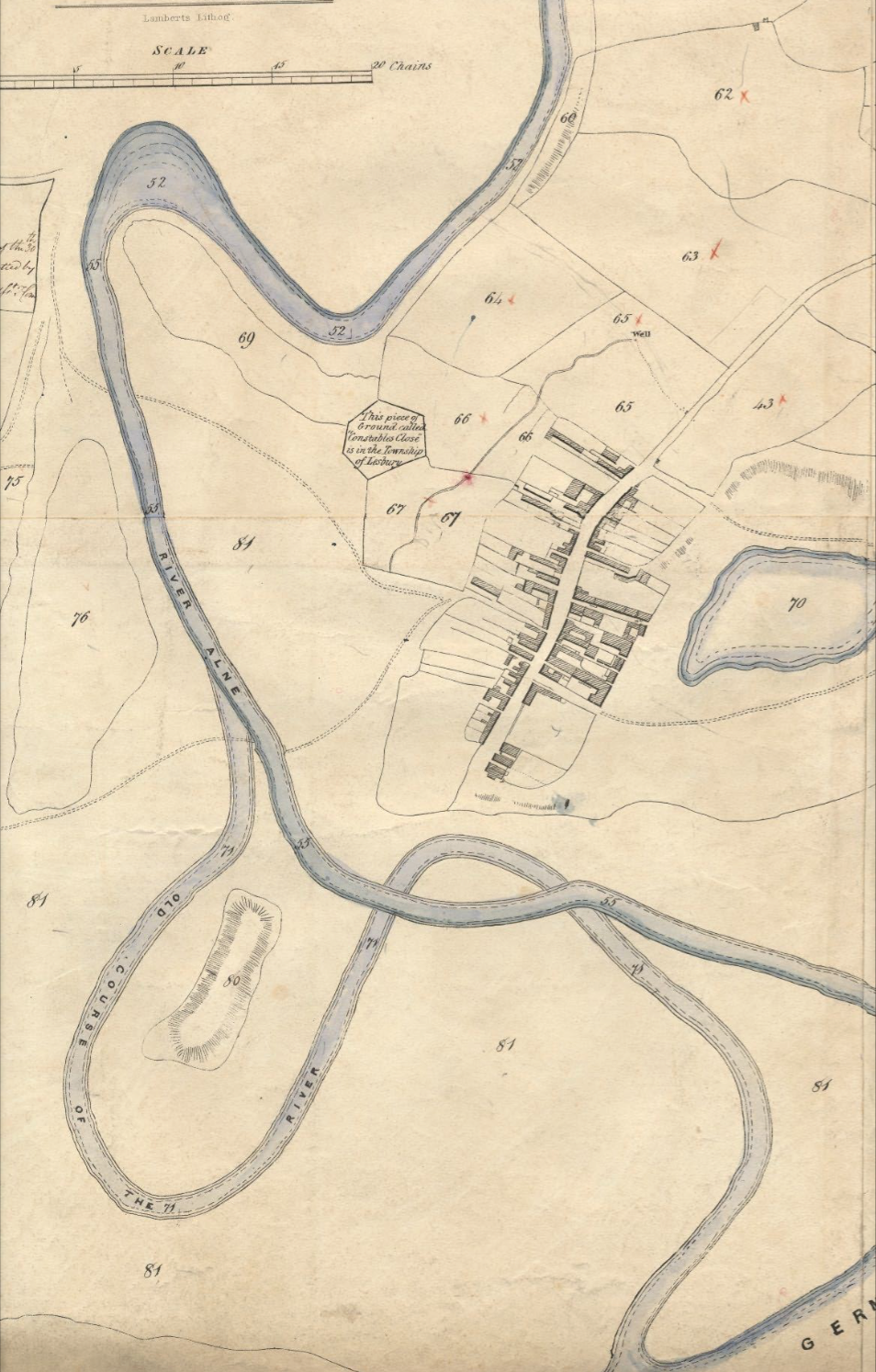
Tithe map of Alnmouth from 1843, showing the changed course of the River Aln after a storm in 1806 diverted it from an oxbow meander to a straighter course

A shift in the course of the river was sometimes, and perhaps falsely, identified as a cause of the decline of the port. This shift occurred on Christmas Day 1806, when a violent storm breached the northern end of the Church Hill sandbank, allowing the river to divert away from a south–north meander to take a more direct course to the sea.

The 19th century saw a decline in traffic at the port, falling off completely at the end of the century. The number of herring boats decreased from 12 in 1858 to 8 in 1863. Corn exports fell as railways assumed the burden and grain exporting was moved to more efficient and connected ports. Yet timber and slate importation appears to have continued: in 1887, 40 men were employed in this industry; and other shore-side concerns appear buoyant; the sawmill thrived, with 27 employees in 1891, and there was a large steam-mill used to process grain and drive a circular sawmill. Apparently the port's death-knell was the capsizal of the timber ship Joanna in the shallow harbour in 1896, after which it became difficult to secure insurance for freight passing through Alnmouth.

== Victorian resort ==
The effects of the decline in port traffic were offset by a new role for the village, as a holiday and second-home resort. Rising prosperity was one factor, but two developments were key: the advent of the railways, and the sale in 1843 of the Gallon estate, which had by 1744 purchased the manorial rights to Alnmouth and controlled perhaps half of the land within the village. The East Coast Main Line, as it is now known, arrived at Bilton, west of Alnmouth, in 1847, and a branch-line from Alnwick to Bilton was in operation by 1850. A bridge was built across the Aln connecting directly to Hipsburn in 1857, and improved and renamed the Duchess's Bridge in 1864. Now, spacious villas with sea-views were built, granary buildings converted to residential use or demolished to make way for new cottages. Maps of 1897 show a holiday camp, garden tea-room and many beach-huts amongst the dunes. Heated baths were available by the village's gas station. A links golf course was established in 1869; it is believed that it was designed by Mungo Park, who became the club's first professional.

A brief history of the village was written in 1851 by William Dickson, entitled Four Chapters from the History of Alnmouth.

The village was in 1860 selected as one of fourteen weather stations, and equipped with a barometer by the Duke of Northumberland acting as president of the Royal National Lifeboat Institution. The barometer and a chart of recent readings was kept on public display, to seek to provide fishermen with indications of likely weather patterns so as to assist in reducing losses at sea. The barometer remains on display, in the window of a cottage facing on the main street. In November 1876 a new church, St John the Baptist on Northumberland Street, was consecrated by the Bishop of Durham.

== Coastal defences ==
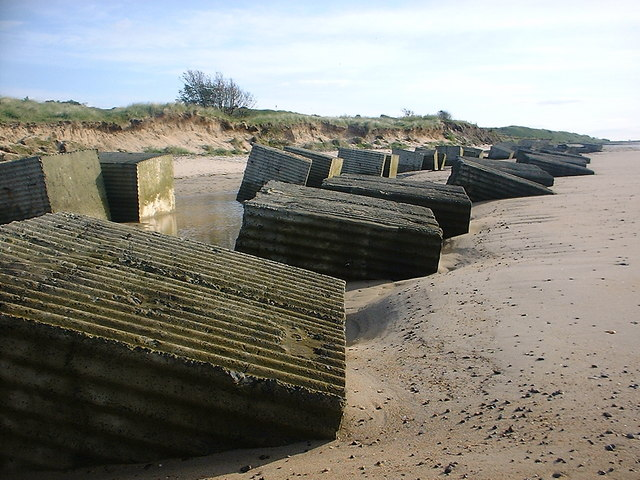
Two lines of WW2 anti-tank cubes defend Alnmouth's north beach

Alnmouth has been affected by war and by the fear of war throughout its history. It was sacked by the Scots in the 14th century, and may have been occupied by the French in the 16th century. In the mid- to late-18th century its ships risked French corsairs on the high seas. In August 1779 two French privateers were involved in a two-hour action against a British Man-of-war, Content, within sight of Alnmouth. In the following month, on 23 September 1779, Alnmouth was attacked by the American privateer John Paul Jones, in support of the American War of Independence. Jones fired a cannonball at the town; it missed the church tower and landed in a field before striking a farmhouse roof. An Alnmouth vessel, the Two Brothers was taken by a privateer in 1796.

The early 19th century had seen trade at the port affected by the Napoleonic Wars and fear of French invasion persisted until late in the century. The Duke of Northumberland maintained an army, the Percy volunteers, against the threat, and a gun battery was installed overlooking Alnmouth in 1852. Similar invasion fears arose during World War II, and a variety of defences were installed on the south and north beaches at Alnmouth, including concrete anti-tank cubes, an anti-tank ditch, pill-boxes, reinforcement of the previous century's gun battery, and firing slits built into the walls of the Church Hill guano shed. Remains of many of these defences are evident today.

The village witnessed a number of engagements during WW2, including the shooting down of two Junkers Ju 88A in separate engagements between 9 and 11 April 1941. On 8 June 1941 a barrage balloon at Alnmouth was shot down, and in August the railway line was bombed by a low-flying plane at a point south of the village. Alnmouth (and other local coastal settlements) was strafed on 3 June 1941, and on 8 November of that year two high-explosive bombs were dropped on the village, one hitting a house in Argyle Street, and leading to the death of six women and one man.
