= Defence of the Realm Act 1798 =

Act of the Parliament of Great Britain

- Act of Parliament
- Parliament of Great Britain
- Long title: An Act to enable His Majesty more effectually to provide for the Defence and Security of the Realm during the present War, and for indemnifying Persons who may suffer in their Property by such Measures as may be necessary for that Purpose.
- Citation: 38 Geo. 3. c. 27
- Territorial extent: Great Britain

Dates
- Royal assent: 5 April 1798
- Commencement: 5 April 1798 (Note: The Acts of Parliament (Commencement) Act 1793.)
- Repealed: 21 August 1871
Other legislation
Repealed by	Statute Law Revision Act 1871
Relates to	Defence of the Realm Act 1803; Defence of the Realm Act 1806; Defence of the Realm Act 1914

Status: Repealed

Text of statute as originally enacted

The Defence of the Realm Act 1798 (38 Geo. 3. c. 27) was an act of the Parliament of Great Britain "to enable His Majesty more effectually to provide for the Defence and Security of the Realm during the present War, and for indemnifying Persons who may suffer in their Property by such Measures as may be necessary for that Purpose".

== Subsequent developments ==
The whole act was repealed by section 1 of, and the schedule to, the Statute Law Revision Act 1871 (34 & 35 Vict. c. 116), which came into force on 21 August 1871.

== See also ==
- Defence of the Realm Act 1803
- Defence of the Realm Act 1806
- Defence of the Realm Act 1914
