= Restoration of Order in Ireland Act 1920 =

Act of the Parliament of the United Kingdom

Restoration of Order in Ireland Act 1920 (Note: Section 2.)
- Act of Parliament
- Parliament of the United Kingdom
- Long title: An Act to make provision for the Restoration and Maintenance of Order in Ireland.
- Citation: 10 & 11 Geo. 5. c. 31
- Territorial extent: Ireland (Note: Section 1.)

Dates
- Royal assent: 9 August 1920
- Commencement: 9 August 1920 (Note: The Acts of Parliament (Commencement) Act 1793.)
- Repealed: 18 December 1953
Other legislation
Amends	Defence of the Realm Consolidation Act 1914
Repealed by	Statute Law Revision Act 1953
Relates to	Defence of the Realm Acts

Status: Repealed

Text of statute as originally enacted

The Restoration of Order in Ireland Act 1920 (10 & 11 Geo. 5. c. 31) was an act of the Parliament of the United Kingdom passed on 9 August 1920 to address the collapse of the British civilian administration in Ireland during the Irish War of Independence.

In effect a special extension of the Defence of the Realm Acts, the aim of the act was to increase convictions of nationalist rebels while averting the need to declare martial law. Following a guillotine motion, royal assent was received on 9 August. Under Section 3(6) of the act military authorities were empowered to jail any Irish person without charge or trial (see Internment). Secret courts-martial were established and lawyers (appointed by Crown agents) could be present only if the death penalty was involved. Inquests of military or police actions were banned.

== Background ==
By the middle of 1920, Ireland was in the throes of a full-fledged rebellion that was barely recognised by the British Government in Ireland headquartered in Dublin Castle. The Irish Republican Army (IRA), the military arm of the Dáil Éireann revolutionary government, was engaged in a guerrilla campaign to destroy elements of British power, particularly burning down courthouses and attacking members of the RIC, Britain’s police force in the countryside.

The British response to the increase in violence and the assassination of police officers was twofold. To suppress the IRA "murderers," Major-General Hugh Tudor, commander of the Royal Irish Constabulary (RIC) and self-styled "Chief of Police", began supplementing that body with the employment of World War I veterans known as the "Black and Tans" because of the colour of their surplus World War I uniforms, and an additional temporary force of Auxiliaries. With little discipline and utter indifference to the plight or moral indignation of the Irish population, these groups raided and burned villages, creameries, and farm buildings to intimidate supporters of the IRA.

The second measure was the enactment of the Restoration of Order in Ireland Act (ROIA). The act was envisioned as a remedy to the problem perceived by Chief Secretary for Ireland Sir Hamar Greenwood that, "throughout the greater part of Ireland criminal justice can no longer be administered by the ordinary constitutional process of trial by judge and jury."

The genesis of the act may be seen in a Cabinet discussion on 31 May 1920, in which the members focused on the violence in Ireland. Rather than addressing violence as the product of rebellion, Greenwood insisted that, "The great task is to crush out murder and arson." He asserted that the violence was perpetrated by "[t]hugs" who were being "handsomely paid." Commenting on a pending Irish bill, Secretary of State for War Winston Churchill stated that, "You should include in the Bill a special tribunal for trying murderers. It is monstrous that we have some 200 murders and no one hung." The prime minister agreed that he felt "certain you must hang," but questioned whether "you can get convictions from Catholics." The concern of all was that the civil courts were incapable of strictly administering justice to the revolutionaries because the juries largely consisted of Irish Catholics. The ensuing discussion of possibly imposing court-martial jurisdiction was inconclusive.

After the 31 May meeting, Greenwood investigated the feasibility of imposing martial law in Ireland, and raised martial law as the specific subject of a 23 July 1920 conference committee meeting of the Cabinet led by Prime Minister David Lloyd George to which the key members of the Dublin Castle administration were invited. Mr. William E. Wylie, the law advisor at Dublin Castle, noted that the RIC was disintegrating through resignations brought on by terrorist attacks, and that with "regard to the Civil Courts, the entire administration of the Imperial Government had ceased." The civilian participants from Dublin Castle, especially Wylie, maintained that martial law was counter-productive, and would only antagonise the Irish people. As an alternative to martial law, General Tudor argued for the imposition of court-martial jurisdiction. Tudor argued forcefully that court-martial jurisdiction over all crimes would support the Black and Tans and Auxiliaries that he was recruiting. He declaimed that "not a single criminal had been brought to justice for murder." Lloyd George closed the discussion directing the Dublin Castle participants to provide final proposals for enforcement of the laws.

A draft bill to establish military criminal jurisdiction was considered by the Cabinet on 26 July. The prime minister's most telling contribution was his question as to "how a man would be killed. Would he be shot or hanged?" It appears that he was comforted by the response that the defendant would be tried under the ordinary law which implied death by hanging. The resulting bill was completed by 30 July 1920, and was then quickly pushed through Parliament and received royal assent on 9 August 1920. The ROIA provided that all crimes punishable under the laws in Ireland could be brought before a court-martial. The court-martial would have the power to impose any punishment authorised by statute or common law including the death penalty. The final step was taken on 20 August 1920, when the final regulations for implementation went into effect.

=== The court-martial of Kevin Barry ===
The most celebrated case and the first murder trial by court-martial under the ROIA was the trial of 18-year-old Kevin Barry on 20 October 1920. Barry had been captured by British troops on 20 September 1920 when a party of the Dublin IRA, including Barry, attempted to ambush soldiers guarding a British Army lorry in an attempt to capture the soldiers' weapons. During the ambush, three British soldiers had been killed.

Although there was no evidence as to the specific killer, on 28 September 1920 Dublin Castle elected to try him under the ROIA for "Offenses ... of such a character that they cannot adequately be dealt with by a Court of Summary Jurisdiction." For purposes of jurisdiction he was to "be treated as if he belonged to the Detach. 1/Bn. Lancashire Fusilers [sic].". The formal order convening the general court-martial was issued on 15 October 1920, charging Barry with three counts of first degree murder relating to the three dead soldiers. During the subsequent trial, Barry refused to recognize the court's jurisdiction or present any evidence in his defense. He was found guilty of the first charge (resulting in the dropping of the other charges) and sentenced to death by hanging.

Barry's sentence was publicly announced on 29 October 1920, and it was stated that he would be executed at Mountjoy Prison in three days. The republican press responded with scathing condemnation of the pending execution of a mere "boy" referred to as "Master Kevin Barry". Notwithstanding public outrage and the attempted intervention of the Archbishop of Dublin and the Lord Mayor of Dublin, the Lord Lieutenant of Ireland Sir John French refused to modify the sentence. A last minute telephone appeal to Prime Minister Lloyd George was also firmly rebuffed.

At about 6:00 a.m. on Monday 1 November, crowds began to gather outside of to begin a vigil. By 7:00 some 2,000 people were present, and the crowd continued to grow. The British authorities reacted by bringing up an armoured car that drove through the crowd and stopped with its gun turret trained on the crowd. Notwithstanding intimidation, at 7:45 a.m., a contingent of the Cumann na mBan, the women's auxiliary of the IRA, marched up in uniform and knelt in a line outside the prison to conduct prayers.

Inside the prison, Kevin Barry was hanged at 8:00 a.m. Canon John Waters and his assistant, Father Matthew McMahon, had arrived at Barry’s cell an hour earlier to celebrate mass and witness the execution. Afterward, they described the scene to the press in terms that all but sanctified Barry. They reported that Barry received them in his cell with rosary beads in hand and a smile on his face. He was “cheerful and unmoved,” and after the mass, as he proceeded to the gallows, he never "flinched or wavered." When the executioner approached to blindfold him, he stated that he did not want it, as "he was a soldier and not afraid to die." Canon Waters stated, "His last thoughts were not of this world. He died a brave and beautiful death, marked by great humility and resignation to the will of God. He died a holy and a Christian death. He died with prayers on his lips for his friends and enemies." Father McMahon agreed that “[h]e was as brave as a lion, and died as holy as a saint,” and added, "He must have passed straight into Heaven as a reward for his perfect resignation to death, and his acceptance of God’s Divine Will."

The headlines in Tuesday’s Irish Independent announced, "Execution of Kevin Barry in Mountjoy. Without a Tremor to the End. Asked for No Pity. But Requested Irish Prayers." Not to be outdone, the Freeman’s Journal proclaimed, "The Heroic Sacrifice. Kevin Barry Yields His Life for Ireland Without Flinching. A Brave Boy’s Fortitude. He goes to the Scaffold Praying for His Friends and Enemies." The Journal's editorial ennobled Barry’s death:

Vengeance has been wreaked upon the school-boy Kevin Barry. The vengeance is blind... It adds to the tragedy that he died with more than a man’s courage, but in the temper of a Christian. He might have saved his life by giving the names of his comrades. The offer should have cancelled the sentence. He refused though the scaffold gloomed upon him. But he died praying for his executioners. He had just arrived at the years when the soul of a boy is fullest of generosity and noble sentiment. Such lads as he are the salt of a nation, the salt of the earth. The ghastly thing about this strife is that it is the very best and most generous of the young manhood of Ireland that has been driven to revolt and is now being warred upon.

In contrast, Dublin Castle issued no press release or explanation of the rationale for the sentence, thus ceding a complete propaganda victory to the Irish republican cause. The only statement from Dublin Castle was the posting of the following notice on the prison gate, shortly after 8:00 a.m.:

The sentence of the law passed on Kevin Barry, found guilty of murder, was carried into execution at 8 a.m. to-day.
By Order.

=== Implementation ===
The combination of growing police and military pressure and recourse to the ROIA led to increased internments of known or suspected IRA members and a steady increase in convictions to 50-60 per week. This made it more difficult for IRA soldiers to continue openly working day jobs while carrying on part-time guerrilla activities. As a result, the IRA shifted its approach to guerrilla warfare in the rural counties. Volunteers from IRA units were organised into elite, full-time, mobile flying columns of around 25 men who would live off the land and on the run. These flying columns proved to be more suited to ambushes of patrols and convoys and other targets of opportunity, rather than attacks on barracks which had become better defended.

On 10 December 1920 martial law was proclaimed in counties Cork, Kerry, Limerick, and Tipperary. In January 1921 martial law was extended to Clare and Waterford.

In a crucial judgement, R (Egan) v Macready, the Irish courts ruled that the act did not give power to impose the death penalty. This would no doubt have proved politically contentious had not hostilities ended the same day.

Despite its name, the courts were of the view that ROIA applied in England too. Following the creation of the Irish Free State, when the act was repealed by implication, it was still used to deport ex-members of the Irish Self-Determination League to Ireland.

== Subsequent developments ==
The whole act was repealed by section 1 of, and the first schedule to, the Statute Law Revision Act 1953 (2 & 3 Eliz. 2. c. 5), which came into force on 18 December 1953.

== Bibliography ==
- Ainsworth, John S. (2000). British Security Policy in Ireland, 1920-1921: A Desperate Attempt by the Crown to Maintain Anglo-Irish Unity by Force. Proceedings 11th Irish-Australian Conference. Perth, Western Australia: Murdoch University.
- Bennett, Richard (2011). The Black and Tans: The British Special Police in Ireland. New York, NY: Barnes & Noble Books.
- Cassel, Felix (19 July 1920). Cabinet Memorandum: Martial Law in Ireland. Copy of Letter from the Judge Advocate General to the Chief Secretary for Ireland. CAB/24/109 – via The National Archives (UK).
- Clark, David J.; McCoy, Gerard (2000). The Most Fundamental Legal Right: Habeas Corpus in the Commonwealth. Oxford University Press. ISBN 0-19-826584-0.
- Hopkinson, Michael (2002). The Irish War of Independence. Montreal, Quebec: McGill-Queen's University Press.
- Jones, Thomas (23 July 1920a). Cabinet Memorandum: The Situation in Ireland. Notes of a Conference with the Officers of the Irish Government. p. 1. CAB/24/109 – via The National Archives (UK).
- Jones, Thomas (30 July 1920b). Cabinet Memorandum: Restoration of Order in Ireland Bill. CAB/24/110/9 – via The National Archives (UK).
- Jones, Thomas (1971). Middlemas, Keith (ed.). Whitehall Diary. Vol. III, Ireland 1918-1925. London: Oxford University Press.
- Leeson, D. M. (2012). The Black and Tans: British Police and Auxiliaries in the Irish War of Independence, 1920-1921. Oxford, England: Oxford University Press.
- McGuffin, John (1973). Internment!. Tralee, Ireland: Anvil Books Ltd.
