= Levy en Masse Act 1803 =

Act of the Parliament of the United Kingdom

- Act of Parliament
- Parliament of the United Kingdom
- Long title: An Act to amend and render more effectual, an Act passed in the present Session of Parliament, intituled, An Act to enable His Majesty to provide for the Defence and Security of the Realm during the present War, and for indemnifying Persons who may suffer in their Property by such Measures as may be necessary for That Purpose; and to enable his Majesty most effectually and speedily to exercise his ancient and undoubted Prerogative in requiring the Military Service of his liege Subjects in case of Invasion of the Realm.
- Citation: 43 Geo. 3. c. 96
- Introduced by: Charles Philip Yorke (Commons)
- Territorial extent: United Kingdom

Dates
- Royal assent: 27 July 1803
- Commencement: 27 July 1803 (Note: The Acts of Parliament (Commencement) Act 1793.)
- Repealed: 16 July 1806
Other legislation
Amends	Defence of the Realm Act 1803
Amended by	Levy en Masse Amendment Act 1803
Repealed by	Defence of the Realm (No. 2) Act 1806

Status: Repealed

Text of statute as originally enacted

The Levy en Masse Act 1803 (43 Geo. 3. c. 96) was an act of the Parliament of the United Kingdom. Although formally presented as an amendment of the Defence of the Realm Act 1803 (43 Geo. 3. c. 55), it was actually a major piece of new legislation as it required counties in Great Britain to draw up lists of men for military training and detailed how compulsory training would take place. However, the act included clauses that military training could be suspended if sufficient numbers of men joined volunteer corps, and the huge increase in their number in response to the Act meant that compulsory military training was never used.

== Provisions ==
The act revived the idea of posse comitatus and detailed mechanisms for military training in each parish in Britain. It stated that lords-lieutenant and their deputies should list all men between seventeen and fifty-five except clergymen, Quakers, schoolmasters, and the infirm. The list would be classified into four classes: unmarried men under thirty with no living children under ten years of age; unmarried men aged between thirty and fifty, with no living children under ten; married men between seventeen and thirty with no more than two living children under ten; and those not included in the previous classifications. They would then be trained, armed and eligible in case of invasion to be called out anywhere in the British Isles.

== Passage ==
Charles Philip Yorke (then Secretary at War) introduced the legislation as a 'Military Service Bill' on 18 July 1803 and it was passed quickly through Parliament, receiving royal assent on the 27 July. The detail of the passing of the bill through Parliament were:

House of Commons

- Ordered: 18 July 1803
- Presented, read, committed; considered; reported 18 July: 1803
- Recommitted and considered: 20 July 1803
- Passed Commons: 22 July 1803

House of Lords

- Amendments: 26 July 1803
- Amendments considered and agreed to: 26 July 1803

Royal assent

- 27 July 1803

== Implementation ==
The act was never raised for training due to the massive number of volunteers.

== Amendments ==
Levy en Masse Amendment Act 1803
- Act of Parliament
- Parliament of the United Kingdom
- Long title: Act to amend an Act made in this present Session of Parliament intituled An Act to amend and render more effectual an Act passed in the present Session of Parliament intituled An Act to enable his Majesty more effectually to provide for the Defence and Security of the Realm during the present War and for indemnifying Persons who may suffer in their Property by such Measures as may be necessary for that Purpose and to enable his Majesty more effectually and speedily to exercise his ancient and undoubted Prerogative in requiring the Military Service of his liege Subjects in case of Invasion of the Realm.
- Citation: 43 Geo. 3. c. 120
- Territorial extent: United Kingdom

Dates
- Royal assent: 11 August 1803
- Commencement: 11 August 1803
- Repealed: 16 July 1806
Other legislation
Amends	Levy en Masse Act 1803
Repealed by	Defence of the Realm (No. 2) Act 1806

Status: Repealed

Text of statute as originally enacted

The act was amended by the Levy en Masse Amendment Act 1803 (43 Geo. 3. c. 120), passed on 11 August 1803, which stated, amongst other things, that if the number of volunteers in any county was satisfactory to the King he could suspend the operation of the Levy en Masse Act even if they did not amount to the three-fourths of the first classification.
