= 5th Battalion, Royal Northumberland Fusiliers =

Reserve unit of the British Army

2nd Northumberland Rifle Volunteer Corps 5th Bn, Royal Northumberland Fusiliers 53rd (Royal Northumberland Fusiliers) S/L Rgt, RA 638th (Royal Northumberland Fusiliers) Rgt, RA 588 (Royal Northumberland Fusiliers) LAA Rgt, RA
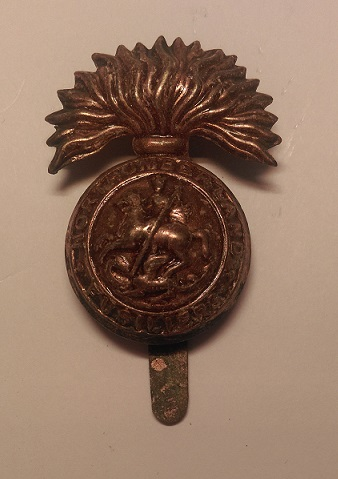
- Royal Northumberland Fusiliers cap badge
- Active: 1861—1918; 1920—1945; 1947—1950
- Country: United Kingdom
- Branch: British Army: Royal Northumberland Fusiliers; Royal Artillery
- Type: Infantry; Searchlight; Light Anti-Aircraft Artillery
- Role: Air defence artillery
- Size: Battalion/Regiment
- Garrison/HQ: Walker-on-Tyne
- Nickname: Tynemouth Rifles
- Engagements: South African War; First World War; Second World War

The 2nd Northumberland Rifle Volunteer Corps, also referred to as the Tynemouth Rifles, was an infantry unit of Britain's part-time Volunteer Force, raised as part of the [Rifle Volunteer Movement in the 1860s. It became the 5th Battalion, Northumberland Fusiliers in the Territorial Force, serving during the First World War, and then the Territorial Army. It converted to an anti-aircraft role just prior to Second World War, and continued to serve until it was amalgamated in 1950.

== Volunteer Force ==
The enthusiasm for the Volunteer movement following an invasion scare in 1859 saw the creation of many Rifle Volunteer Corps (RVCs) composed of part-time soldiers eager to supplement the Regular British Army in time of need. One of these new corps was the 1st Northumberland RVC (also known as the Northumberland Rifles) formed in North Shields and Tynemouth on 16 August 1859 by coal-owner Edward Potter of Cramlington. It took some moral courage to appear in the street in Volunteer uniform: members of the 1st Northumberland RVC were sneered at as 'noodles'. However, the movement continued to grow: in February 1860, the 1st absorbed the 2nd Northumberland RVC of three companies, also formed at Tynemouth on 4 January that year. In August 1861, it split to form the 1st (Tynemouth), 8th (three companies at Walker-on-Tyne) and 9th (Cramlington) Northumberland RVCs, which were all placed in the 2nd Administrative Battalion of Northumberland Rifle Volunteers. The 1st disbanded in October 1862 and the 9th in December 1864, but the 8th (Walker) Northumberland RVC thrived. The HQ of the 2nd Admin Battalion moved to Walker after the disbandment of the 1st; it was disbanded in 1865 and the 8th continued as an independent corps with James Anderson, a former ensign in the 30th Foot, as lieutenant-colonel in command. A number of its officers were drawn from the prominent Tyneside family of Swan. During this period, the battalion was organised as;

- Battalion Headquarters in Tynemouth – HQ moving to Newcastle upon Tyne in 1863
- 1st (Tynemouth) Northumberland RVC – raised 16 August 1859: three coys separated Aug 1861 to form 8th RVC in Walker and one coy separated to form 9th RVC in Cramlington: disbanded Oct 1862
- 8th (Walker) Northumberland RVC – formed Aug 1861 from three coys of the 1st RVC
- 9th (Cramlington) Northumberland RVC – formed Aug 1861 from one coy of 1st RVC: disbanded Dec 1864

Under the scheme of 'localisation' introduced by the Cardwell Reforms in 1873, the Northumberland and Newcastle upon Tyne RVCs, together with the two Regular battalions of the Northumberland Fusiliers and the Northumberland Militia, constituted Brigade No 1, based at Newcastle in the County of Northumberland sub-district of Northern District. While the sub-districts were referred to as 'brigades', they were purely administrative organisations and the Volunteers were excluded from the 'mobilisation' part of the Cardwell system, though they carried out joint manoeuvres. Lieutenant-Colonel Anderson retired in 1875 and was appointed Honorary Colonel of the battalion; he was succeeded in command by Henry Swan who ran the Walker shipyard of Charles Mitchell and later Armstrong Whitworth. Swan remained in command until 1902.

When the RVCs were consolidated nationwide on 3 September 1880, the 8th RVC was re-numbered as the 2nd Northumberland Rifle Volunteer Corps with companies designated as 'A' to 'F'. After the Childers Reforms, the RVCs became Volunteer Battalions of their affiliated Regular Army regiment and, in 1883, the 2nd Northumberland RVC became the 2nd Volunteer Battalion, Northumberland Fusiliers. The uniform included a scarlet coat with Gosling green facings. The Stanhope Memorandum of December 1888 proposed a more comprehensive Mobilisation Scheme for Volunteer units, which would assemble in their own brigades at key points in case of war. In peacetime, these brigades provided a structure for collective training. Under this scheme the 2nd and 3rd VBs of the Northumberland Fusiliers and the five Durham Light Infantry VBs formed the Tyne and Tees Brigade.

In 1894, K Company from the 1st Volunteer Battalion at Newburn (formed in 1885) was transferred to the 2nd as G Company. The following year, the 2nd VB formed a new company at Wallsend and by 1900 the battalion had grown to ten companies, at Walker (4), Newburn (2), Wallsend (2) and Gosforth (2).

Between 1900 and 1902, volunteers from the 2nd VB went to South Africa and participated with their Regular counterparts in the 1st and 2nd Battalions. As a reward for their service, the battalion was granted its first battle honour: South Africa 1900-02. Engagements during this period included service in the Orange Free State, service in Transvaal, and later the Battle of Rustenburg.

== Territorial Force ==
In 1907, Secretary of State for War Richard Haldane announced a series of Army reforms, which would affect mostly the Volunteers and Yeomanry. These two groups were merged to form the Territorial Force on 1 April 1908. As part of these reforms, all of the volunteer battalions became numbered battalions of their parent regiments. The battalion was renamed as the 5th Battalion, The Northumberland Fusiliers and subsequently re-organised as follows:

- Battalion Headquarters in Walker
- A–C Companies in Walker
- D–F Companies in Wallsend
- G Company in Gosforth with detachments in West Moor and Seaton Burn
- H Company in Gosforth

Another organisational change of the reforms of 1908 was the creation in the TF of 14 divisions, 14 mounted brigades, and coastal defence troops. One of these new divisions was the Northumbrian Division (later the 50th), and in this division was the Northumbrian Brigade (later the 149th). The 5th Bn along with the 4th, 6th, and 7th bns of the Royal Northumberland Fusiliers were all part of this brigade.

== First World War ==
=== Mobilisation ===
In July 1914, as the international situation worsened, the British Armed Forces were on high alert as the Imperial German Army moved towards the neutral nation of the Kingdom of Belgium, of which the United Kingdom protected under the Treaty of London. When German forces crossed into Belgium, the United Kingdom declared war on Germany and later the rest of the Central Powers. At the time, the units of the Northumbrian Division were at their annual training camp in North Wales. On 3 August, they were ordered to return to their respective headquarters, where at 17.00 next day they received orders to mobilise. The units went to their war stations along the coast, where there were numerous alerts. In October, the division became part of Central Force in Home Defence and manned the Tyne Defences.

On the outbreak of war, TF units were invited to volunteer for Overseas Service. The large majority of the Northumbrian Division accepted. On 15 August, the War Office (WO) issued instructions to separate those men who had signed up for Home Service only, and form these into reserve units. On 31 August, the formation of a reserve or 2nd Line unit was authorised for each 1st Line unit where 60 per cent or more of the men had volunteered for Overseas Service. The titles of these 2nd Line units would be the same as the original, but distinguished by a '2/' prefix. In this way duplicate battalions, brigades and divisions were created, mirroring those TF formations being sent overseas.

=== 1/5th Battalion ===
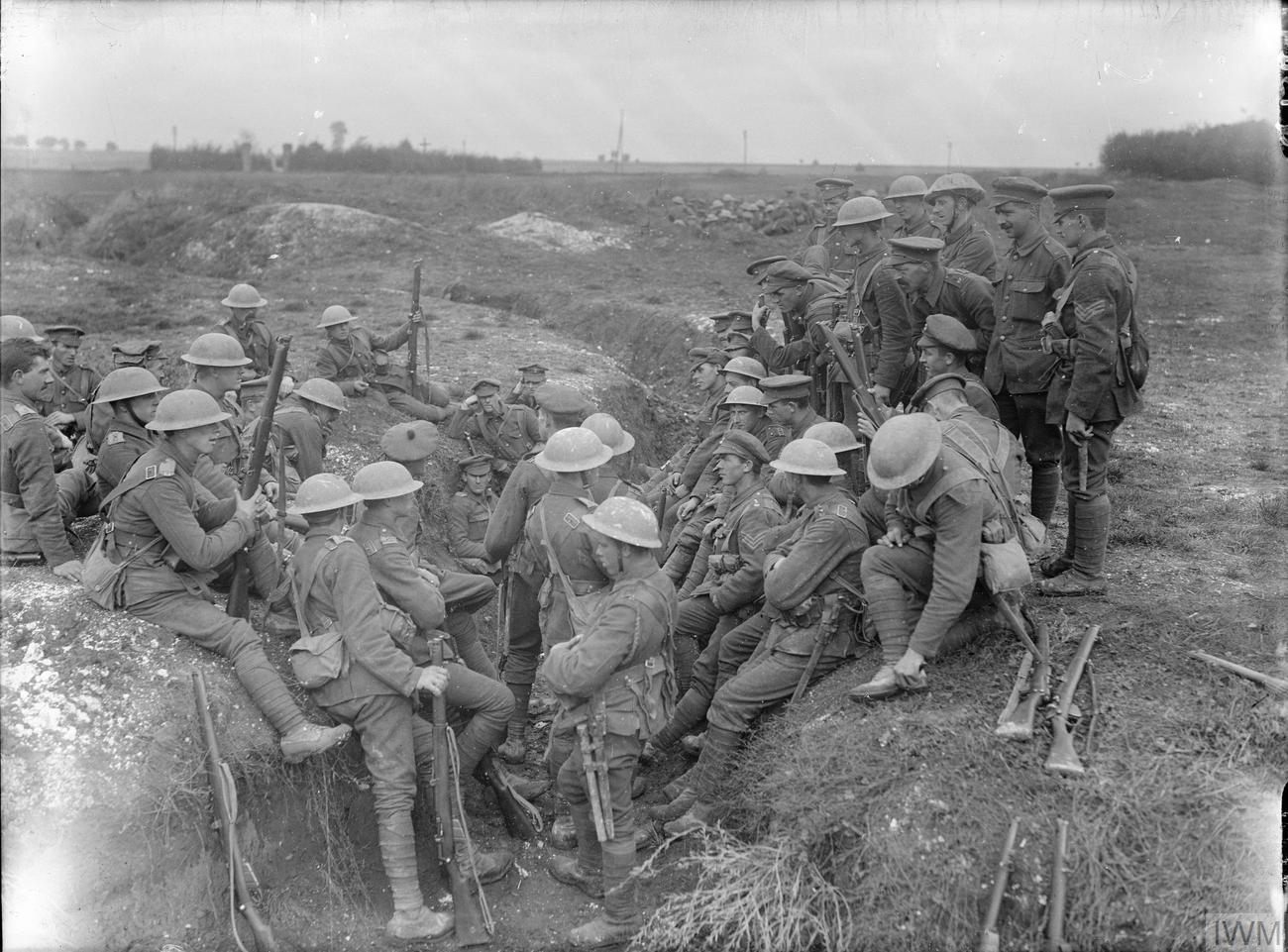
Northumberland Fusiliers in a reserve trench at Thiepval, September 1916.

In April 1915, the 1/5th Battalion moved to France and saw action during some notable battles including:

- 1915: Battle of St Julien, Battle of Frezenburg, and Battle of Bellewaarde Ridge
- 1916: Battle of Flers-Courcelette, Battle of Morval, and Battle of the Transloy Ridges
- 1917: First Battle of the Scarpe, Capture of Wancourt Ridge, Second Battle of the Scarpe, and Second Battle of Passchendaele
- 1918: Battle of St Quentin, Actions at the Somme Crossings, Battle of Rosieres, Battle of Estaires, Battle of Hazebrouck, and Battle of the Aisne

Following the armistice on 11 November 1918, the battalion was reduced to a cadre on 15 July and disembodied on 6 November 1918.

=== 2/5th Battalion ===
The 2/5th Battalion was formed in Blyth along with the 2/4th on 22–23 November 1914 just before their respective first line battalions were preparing to go overseas. This new battalion joined the 188th (2/1st Northumberland) Brigade in the newly formed 2nd line 63rd (2nd Northumbrian) Division in January 1915. In July 1916, the division was divided, and the battalion became independent and eventually joined the 217th Brigade in the 72nd Division. Finally, on 6 December 1918, the battalion was disbanded while stationed in Ipswich and replaced by the 264th (Infantry) Battalion, Training Reserve.

=== 5th (Reserve) Battalion ===
The 3/5th Battalion, later 5th (Reserve) Btn, was the last of the duplicates formed with the 3/4th, 3/6th, and 3/7th formed in June 1915. On 8 April 1916, the battalions were all redesignated as 'reserve', and became the 5th (Reserve) Battalion. On 1 September 1918, the battalion was absorbed into the 4th (Reserve) Battalion.

== Interwar ==
When the Territorial Force was disembodied after the end of the First World War, the army was left with just the regulars, most of which were under-strength or just at cadre size. On 7 February 1920, the TF and most of its units were reconstituted, including the 5th Battalion, The Northumberland Fusiliers at Walker-on-Tyne with 'A', 'B', 'C', and 'D' Companies. Once again, it formed part of 149th (Northumberland) Brigade in 50th (Northumbrian) Division. In 1921, the TF was reorganised as the Territorial Army. On 3 June 1935, as part of George V's silver jubilee celebrations, the regiment was granted a Royal title along with three other Regiments and became the Royal Northumberland Fusiliers, and the battalion was renamed likewise.

=== 5th Battalion, Royal Northumberland Fusiliers (53rd Searchlight Regiment) ===
In the late 1930s, the increasing need for anti-aircraft (AA) defence for Britain's cities was addressed by converting a number of TA infantry battalions into searchlight (S/L) units, which accelerated after the Munich Crisis. The 5th Battalion was one of those selected, and was converted on 1 November 1938 as 5th Battalion, Royal Northumberland Fusiliers (53rd Searchlight Regiment), organised as follows:

- Battalion Headquarters, Church Street Drill hall, Walker-on-Tyne under Lieutenant Colonel W H Leete, DFC, TD
- 408th S/L Company under Major G. M. I. Stanley
- 409th S/L Company under Major F. H. Phillips
- 410th S/L Company under Major A. E. B. Plummer, MC
- Affiliation with Armstrong-Whitworth (Walker) Cadet Unit (placed under administrative command)

Unlike some of the infantry battalions previously converted to the AA S/L role, which had transferred to the Royal Engineers (RE), the 5th Bn remained part of the Royal Northumberland Fusiliers for the time being.

Following its change of role, the battalion was placed under the command of the 30th (Northumbrian) Anti-Aircraft Brigade. This was subordinated to 3rd Anti-Aircraft Division, but by the outbreak of war came under a newly formed 7th AA Division tasked with covering North East England.

== Second World War ==
=== Mobilisation ===
In February 1939, the existing AA defences came under the control of a new Anti-Aircraft Command. In June, as the international situation worsened, a partial mobilisation of the TA was begun in a process known as 'couverture', whereby each AA unit did a month's tour of duty in rotation to man selected AA gun and S/L positions. On 24 August, ahead of the declaration of war, AA Command was fully mobilised at its war stations. The 5th Battalion was deployed to support the Newcastle Gun Defence Area (GDA). The S/L layouts had been planned on a spacing of 3,500 yards (3,200 m), but due to equipment shortages this was extended to 6,000 yards (5,500 m).

On 1 August 1940, all of the RE and infantry AA units were brought under command of the Royal Artillery. Therefore, the battalion was renamed as the 53rd (Royal Northumberland Fusiliers) Searchlight Regiment, Royal Artillery with its companies (408, 409, and 410) becoming batteries. During this re-organisation, Anti-Aircraft Command (AA Command) was also being overhauled, with many new brigades and divisions being formed, one of them being the 57th Light Anti-Aircraft Brigade formed on 25 August 1939, which initially only controlled the Light AA (LAA) units of the division.

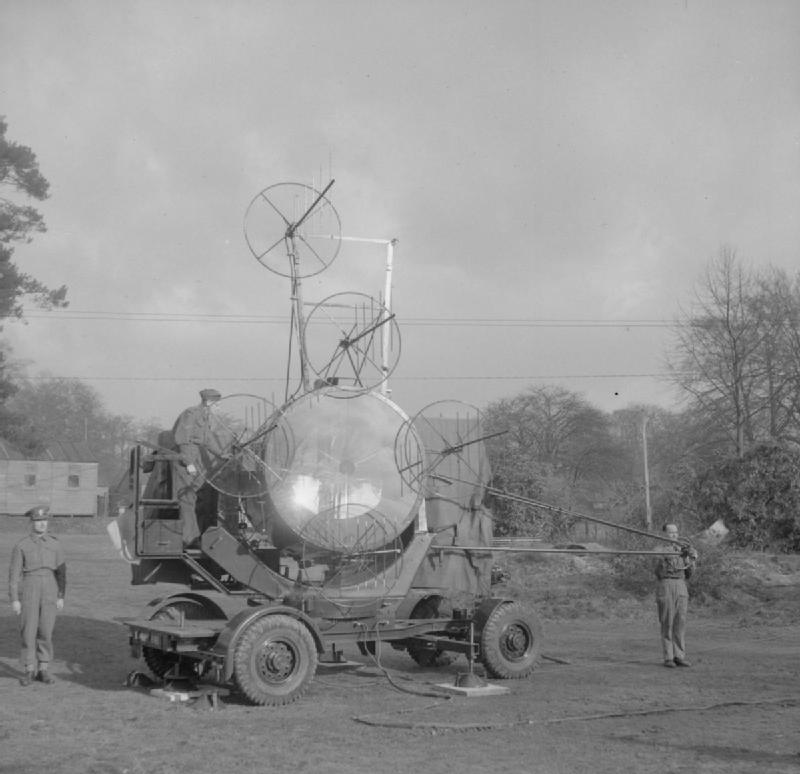
150 cm Anti-aircraft searchlight equipped with SLC (AA Radar No 2) during the Second World War.

=== Newcastle Blitz ===
During the Luftwaffe night-bombing campaign against British cities in the winter of 1940–41 (The Blitz), 30 AA Bde controlled the AA guns in the Newcastle GDA, while 57 AA Bde controlled the S/L layout, including 53rd S/L Regiment. The regiment served through the Newcastle Blitz. In November 1940, AA Command changed its S/L layouts to clusters of three lights to improve illumination, but this meant that the clusters had to be spaced 10,400 yards (9,500 m) apart. The cluster system was an attempt to improve the chances of picking up enemy bombers and keeping them illuminated for engagement by AA guns or Royal Air Force (RAF) Night fighters. Eventually, one light in each cluster was to be equipped with Searchlight Control radar (SLC) and act as 'master light', but the radar equipment was still in short supply.

On 17 April 1941, 565 S/L Bty was formed under the 236th Searchlight Training Rgt at Oswestry from a cadre provided by 53rd S/L Regiment, and shortly joined, and regimented on 12 August 1941. On 18 February 1942, the regiment had a small name change, to become the 53rd Searchlight Regiment, Royal Artillery (Royal Northumberland Fusiliers).

By December 1941, the regiment had moved to 43 AA Bde, still in 7th AA Division but now deployed covering Wearside and Teesside. It remained under 43 AA Bde until August 1942 when it returned to 30 AA Bde

=== Operation Diver ===
By late 1943, AA Command was being forced to release manpower for overseas service, particularly Operation Overlord (the planned Allied invasion of Normandy) and most S/L regiments lost one of their four batteries. 565 S/L Battery began to disband on 25 February 1944, which it completed by 24 March. In March 1944, 30 AA Bde HQ was transferred to the south of England; 53rd S/L Rgt also went south, but joined 47 AA Bde in 2 AA Group. 2 AA Group was responsible for defending the 'Overlord' assembly camps, depots and embarkation ports and was planning for the expected onslaught of V-1 flying bombs against London. Meanwhile, the group had to deal with a sharp increase in Luftwaffe air raids trying to reach London, which continued until May.

By mid-May, 47 AA Bde was being disbanded and the regiment transferred to 44 AA Bde in 6 AA Group, which took over 2 AA Group's responsibilities for the 'Overlord' camps in the Solent–Portsmouth area. On 13 June, a week after the Overlord fleets had left to launch D Day, the first V-1s appeared over southern England. AA Command deployed its Light AA guns alongside S/L positions, hoping that the SLC could guide the LAA guns at night. By day, the S/L positions used their AA Light machine guns in an effort to bring down the fast-moving missiles. The early success rate was low, but later fighter aircraft and radar-directed Heavy AA guns achieved high rates of success against V-1s.

=== 638th (Royal Northumberland Fusiliers) Infantry Regiment, RA ===
In January 1945, the diminishing threat of the Luftwaffe coupled with a manpower shortage in 21st Army Group, particularly in the infantry, led to the conversion of surplus anti-aircraft and coastal artillery regiments in the UK into infantry units. 53rd Searchlight Regiment was one of the regiments selected but it did not revert to its original title, instead becoming 638th (Royal Northumberland Fusiliers) Regiment, Royal Artillery on 23 January 1945.

The regiment was attached to 38 AA Bde, which was converting into 304 Infantry Brigade. After infantry training, including a short period attached to 55th (West Lancashire) Infantry Division, the brigade was moved into the War Office Reserve, and shipped to Norway, landing on 7 June 1945 and joining Norway Command following the liberation of that country (Operation Doomsday). The regiment was still in Norway on 15 November 1945 when 638 Rgt began the process of entering suspended animation, completing the process on 13 December.

== Postwar ==
Following the end of hostilities, most territorial artillery regiments had been placed in suspended animation by late 1946. On 1 January 1947, most of these regiments were reconstituted and many new regiments were formed as part of the reformed and re-organised TA, with new numbers according to the renumbering plan for the complete re-designation of all RA units, both regular and territorial. In accordance with this, the light anti-aircraft (LAA) regiments were assigned numbers between 512 and 588. The 5th Btn was reformed as 588th (Royal Northumberland Fusiliers) Light Anti-Aircraft Regiment, Royal Artillery, and followed the new standard RA organisation, which consisted of RHQ, P, Q, and R Batteries, all of which were based in Walker on Tyne. The regiment provided the LAA component of the TA's 50th (Northumbrian) Infantry Division.

On 1 September 1950, the regiment was converted back to infantry and simultaneously merged with the 4th Btn to form the 4th/5th Battalion, The Royal Northumberland Fusiliers. In 1967, the battalion's Territorial and Army Volunteer Reserve (TAVR) successors were A (Royal Northumberland Fusiliers) Company, Fusilier Volunteers and the 4th/5th/6th (Territorial) Battalion, Royal Northumberland Fusiliers both of which were eventually expanded into the 6th (Northumberland) Battalion, The Royal Regiment of Fusiliers. The Northumberland TA successors are currently part of 'X' and 'Z' companies in the 5th (Volunteer) Battalion, The Royal Regiment of Fusiliers.

== Personalities ==
Commanding Officers

The following served as commanding officers during the First World War I:

1/5th Battalion

- Lieutenant Colonel David Ross MacDonald, 4 August 1914 > replaced
- Colonel Arthur Horsman Coles, 25 November 1915 > replaced
- Lieutenant Colonel Hermann Luhrs, 26 November 1915 > replaced
- Lieutenant Colonel Francis Charles Turner, 14 March 1916 > replaced
- Lieutenant Colonel Nicholas Irwin Wright, 27 September 1916 > invalided
- Lieutenant Colonel Arnold Irwin, 17 March 1918 > wounded
- Lieutenant Colonel Ivan Marshall Tweedy 1 May 1918 > replaced
- Lieutenant Colonel Henry Robert Brown 13 July 1918 > remained CO

2/5th Battalion

- Lieutenant Colonel David Ross MacDonald, 25 November 1914 > replaced
- Lieutenant Colonel Francis William Iles 28 August 1915 > replaced
- Lieutenant Colonel Lionel Grant Oliver, 16 May 1916 > replaced

3/5th (5th Reserve) Battalion

- Lieutenant Colonel Thomas Joseph Carlile, 15 June 1915 > replaced

Honorary Colonels

The battalion's (later regiment's) Honorary Colonels included:

- 1875–1900, Colonel James Anderson, former CO
- 1900–1902, Vacant
- 1902–1908, Brevet Colonel Henry Frederick Swan, CB, VD
- 1908–1910, Vacant
- 1910–1916, Lieutenant-Colonel Matthew White Ridley, 2nd Viscount Ridley, Northumberland Hussars
- 1916–1928, Vacant
- 1928–1938, Honorary Brigadier General Hubert Horatio Shirley Morant, DSO
- 1938–1950, Colonel Bernard Peatfield, OBE, MC, TD, DL (continued 1950 into 4th/5th Btn)

== External sources ==
- British Army units from 1945 on
- Forces War Records
- Grace's Guide to British Industrial History
- Great War Centenary Drill Halls
- The Long, Long Trail
- Orders of Battle at Patriot Files
- T.F. Mills, Land Forces of Britain, the Empire and Commonwealth – Regiments.org (archive site)
- Graham Watson, The Territorial Army 1947
