= Defence of the Realm Consolidation Act 1914 =

Act of the Parliament of the United Kingdom

Defence of the Realm Consolidation Act 1914 (Note: Section 2(1).)
- Act of Parliament
- Parliament of the United Kingdom
- Long title: An Act to consolidate and amend the Defence of the Realm Acts.
- Citation: 5 & 6 Geo. 5. c. 8
- Territorial extent: United Kingdom

Dates
- Royal assent: 27 November 1914
- Commencement: 27 November 1914 (Note: The Acts of Parliament (Commencement) Act 1793.)
- Repealed: 22 December 1927
Other legislation
Repeals/revokes	See § Repealed enactments
Amended by	Defence of the Realm (Amendment) Act 1915; Defence of the Realm (Amendment), No. 2, Act 1915; Defence of the Realm (Amendment) (No. 3) Act 1915; Restoration of Order in Ireland Act 1920
Repealed by	Statute Law Revision Act 1927

Status: Repealed

Text of statute as originally enacted

The Defence of the Realm Consolidation Act 1914 (5 & 6 Geo. 5. c. 8) was an act of the Parliament of the United Kingdom that consolidated enactments related to the defence of the realm during the First World War in the United Kingdom, including the Defence of the Realm Act 1914 (4 & 5 Geo. 5. c. 29) and the Defence of the Realm (No. 2) Act 1914 (c. 63).

== Provisions ==
=== Repealed enactments ===
Section 2(2) of the act repealed 2 enactments, listed in that section. The repeal did not affect any Orders in Council made under the repealed acts, which continued in force until altered or revoked by an Order in Council under the act, and had effect as if made under the act.

Citation	Short title	Description	Extent of repeal
4 & 5 Geo. 5. c. 29	Defence of the Realm Act 1914	An Act to confer on His Majesty in Council power to make Regulations during the present War for the Defence of the Realm.	The whole act.
4 & 5 Geo. 5. c. 63	Defence of the Realm (No. 2) Act 1914	An Act to amend the Defence of the Realm Act, 1914.	The whole act.

== Subsequent developments ==
The whole act was repealed by section 1 of, and the part I of the schedule to, the Statute Law Revision Act 1927 (17 & 18 Geo. 5. c. 42), which came into force on 22 December 1927.
