= 304th Infantry Brigade =

- The brigade's insignia, which featured stylised searchlight beams, and the colours of the Royal Artillery.
- Active: Formed 22 January 1945
- Country: United Kingdom
- Branch: British Army
- Type: Infantry Brigade
- Role: Lines of Communication

The 304th Infantry Brigade was a formation of the British Army organised from surplus Royal Artillery (RA) personnel retrained as infantry towards the end of the Second World War.

== Origin ==
By the end of 1944, 21st Army Group was suffering a severe manpower shortage, particularly among the infantry. At the same time the German Luftwaffe was suffering from such shortages of pilots, aircraft and fuel that serious aerial attacks on the United Kingdom could be discounted. In January 1945 the War Office began to reorganise surplus anti-aircraft and coastal artillery regiments in the UK into infantry battalions, primarily for line of communication and occupation duties in North West Europe, thereby releasing trained infantry for frontline service. The 304th Brigade was one of seven brigades formed from these new units.

== Composition ==
The 304th Infantry Brigade was formed on 22 January 1945 by conversion of the Headquarters of 38th Light Anti-Aircraft Brigade within the 2nd Anti-Aircraft Group. It was commanded by Brigadier C.A.H. Chadwick, followed by Brigadier F.W. Sanders from 24 May 1945, and comprised the following Territorial Army RA units:

- 630th (Essex) Infantry Regiment, Royal Artillery formed by 28th (Essex) Searchlight Regiment RA (TA).
- 637th (The Northamptonshire Regiment) Infantry Regiment, Royal Artillery formed by 50th Searchlight Regiment RA (TA) (The Northamptonshire Regiment), which had originally been converted from the 4th Battalion Northamptonshire Regiment
- 638th (Royal Northumberland Fusiliers) Infantry Regiment, Royal Artillery formed by 53rd (Royal Northumberland Fusiliers) Searchlight Regiment RA (TA), which had originally been converted from 5th Battalion, Royal Northumberland Fusiliers.

== Service ==
After infantry training, including a short period attached to the 55th (West Lancashire) Infantry Division, the 304th Brigade was sent to Norway in June 1945 following the liberation of that country (Operation Doomsday).

== External sources ==
- British Military History website
- Land Forces of Britain, The Empire and Commonwealth
- The Royal Artillery 1939–45
- The Patriot Files
- BBC WW2 People's War
