= Militia and Volunteers of Northumberland =

The Militia and Volunteers of Northumberland are those military units raised in the county independently of the regular Army. The "modern" militia dates from legislation enacted during the Seven Years' War. The volunteers had several forms and separate periods of existence until made a permanent body in 1859.

== Militia ==
Northumberland Militia
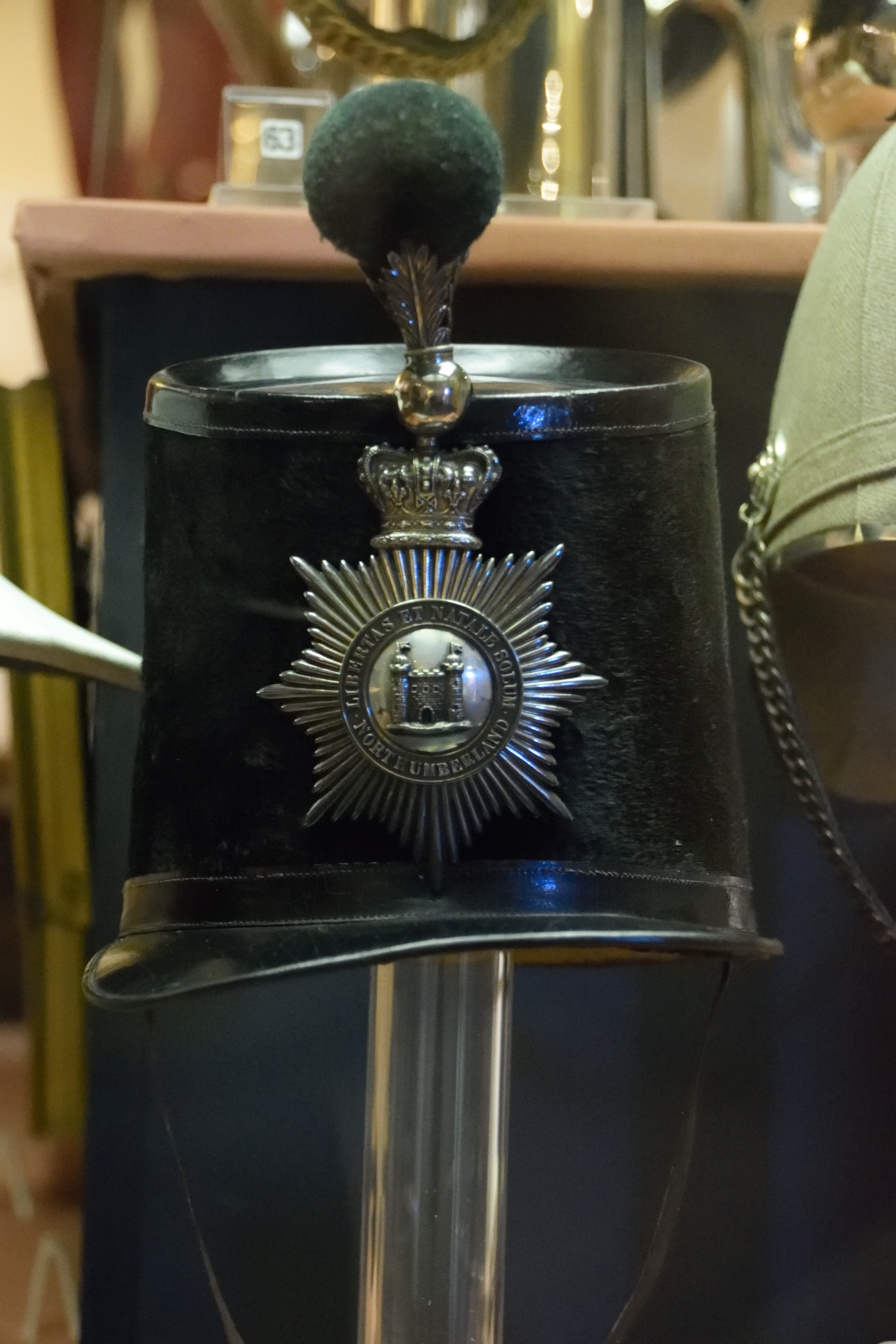
- Officer's Shako of the Northumberland Light Infantry Militia 1855–1861. From the Royal Northumberland Fusiliers Museum, Alnwick Castle.
- Active: 1759–1908
- Disbanded: 1953
- Country: Great Britain; United Kingdom
- Branch: Militia
- Type: Infantry
- Size: One Battalion; Two from June 1798 to November 1799
- Nickname(s): Northumberland Buffs
- Colours: Facing colour: Buff until 1881; Gosling green
- Engagements: Gordon riots Second Boer War

After the invasion scare of 1745, and the later strain on the regular army during the Seven Years' War, bills for the reform of the militia were brought to Parliament, but it was not until 1759 that the Militia Act 1757 (30 Geo. 2. c. 25) would be passed. The act continued with the ballot to select men from each county, in numbers based on a return made by the county authorities of men of eligible age, initially between 18 and 50 years of age. As a substitute could be made on a payment of £10, the burden fell on the working classes. Subsequent explanatory legislation was required to curb rioting in 13 counties over fears of pay and overseas service, the militia would only be used in England and Wales. This included a riot in Hexham in June 1761 when about 5,000 people were confronted by six companies from the North York Militia. By the end, 51 people were dead and 300 wounded including some militiamen, earning the North York Militia the nickname The Hexham Butchers. When not embodied (mobilised) for service the men had an annual training requirement of 28 days by 1762. The legislation was continually amended, for example, by the end of the Napoleonic wars, to permit wider service in the country, fixed terms of service and paying a bounty for volunteering for the regular army.

The militia was under the control of the lord-lieutenant of the county and was to be officered by the local gentry, their rank determined by a property qualification which was gradually reduced or ignored as time progressed. Initially a colonel required an income of £400 a year, or be an heir to twice that amount, lieutenant colonels and majors, £300, captains, £200, lieutenants, £100 and ensigns £50.

=== General militia ===
The regiment of the Northumberland Militia did not form until 1759, it was led by Sir Edward Blackett Bart., and had an initial strength of 560 men, with the headquarters at Alnwick. The militia regiment in its early form was embodied on the following occasions:

- During the Seven Years' War from 23 February 1760 to December 1762, it was stationed in Berwick-upon-Tweed.
- During the American Revolutionary War from 13 April 1778 to December 1782, when France had joined the Americans. It was commanded by Hugh Percy, 2nd Duke of Northumberland, The uniforms had buff waistcoats, and gained the regiment the nickname of the Northumberland Buffs. On 19 May they marched for London, and on 7 June made a 40-mile march, arriving at Holborn to aid the civil power during the Gordon Riots, where they earned praise for their orderly fire on looters and arsonists only. (Note: The inhabitants of Lincoln's Inn Fields subscribed £59 17s. for the soldiers, and gave accommodation to the women and children who had followed them.) They then were posted to Dorking, where they shared a camp with the Nottingham and Sussex Militias, and the 69th (South Lincolnshire) Regiment of Foot. The regiment spent the winter of 1781–2 at Southampton returning to Northumberland via Chatham to be disbanded.
- During the French Revolutionary Wars from the end of 1792 until May 1802 the regiment was tasked with maintaining order as well as anti-invasion duties and for this purpose they were employed outside of their area of recruitment and kept on the move so as to avoid fraternization with the local population. By June 17989 the regiment was 1300 strong and based in Hornsea. Also that year, the Northumberland Supplemental Militia was raised and designated as the 2nd battalion, serving at Sunderland and South Shields before being disbanded in November 1799. During 1799, 266 men of the regiment transferred to the regular army, the 5th, 17th, 56th and 59th regiments of foot and the Royal Artillery.
- Less than a year later, after the short lived Peace of Amiens, the regiment was once again embodied from 22 April 1803 to 24 June 1814 during the Napoleonic Wars, with an initial strength of 649. After spending two years in the North east of England the regiment was dispatched to anti-smuggling duties in Kent, thereafter moving around the South of England, in turn guarding French prisoners of war in 1810, during which time each man of the regiment subscribed one days pay for the relief of British prisoners of war. While in Colchester during 1811, the regiment volunteered for a third time to serve in Ireland, and as a mark of distinction was granted the title of Light Infantry, becoming the Northumberland Light Infantry Militia, and having its offer accepted, arrived in Cork in August. The regiment returned to England at Bristol on 11 October 1813, and Marched to Scotland, wintering in Haddington, it was disbanded in Alnwick on 24 June 1814. During its embodiment 1,159 men had volunteered for service in the regular army or Royal Navy.

Training for balloted men began again in 1820, however desertion was a problem, and again in 1821. Training was infrequent up to 1831 and then went into abeyance along with the Militia movement as a whole.

A new act, the Militia Act 1852 (15 & 16 Vict. c. 50), was passed that revived the militia, with voluntary service (and a bounty of six guineas) but with the ballot remaining an option. Commanded by the earl of Beverly and titled the 27th Northumberland Light Infantry Militia (Note: 27th in the Militia order of precedence.) the first training was attended by 850 men out of the enlisted 1122.

During the Crimean War it was embodied from 9 January 1855 to 20 June 1856 spending early 1856 in Carlisle, where 395 men transferred to the regular army. It was not among those embodied during the manpower shortage caused by the Indian Mutiny. In 1859 the enthusiasm for the militia had waned and only 200 of the 900 on strength turned up. The revival of the Volunteer forces led to competition with the regular army and Volunteers for the available manpower. The rise of local constabularies meant that the militia would be used less for keeping order than to replace regular soldiers on home service during large mobilizations.

=== Reforms and amalgamation ===
New legislation increased ease with which militia officers and men could transfer to the regular army, and resulted it becoming, as Cardwell wanted, more of an auxiliary to the regular line regiments. In 1881, after being brigaded with, but seldom interacting with, the Volunteer units of the county since 1873, but being briefly embodied into the 5th Regiments's Depot in 1878, the Northumberland Light Infantry Militia became the 3rd (Militia) Battalion, The Northumberland Fusiliers.

For the first and only time, the militia battalion would not only be embodied, but also see action during the Second Boer War. The 3rd battalion was embodied on 12 December 1899, with a strength of 412 officers and men. Of these 151 went to South Africa reinforcing the 2nd Battalion of the Northumberland Fusiliers, the remainder were part of the Malta garrison where it guarded Boer prisoners, and received the news that with the raising of the 3rd and 4th regular battalions of the Northumberland Fusiliers it was to be temporarily renamed the 5th (Militia) Battalion. The South Africa contingent would lose 23 men to disease and fighting.

=== The Haldane Reforms ===
In 1908, in large part due to the Militias' resistance to more reform, the militia were reduced to a draft finding and training role. Now renamed the 3rd (Reserve) Battalion, it would take over the running of the regimental Depot, being part of the local garrison during a mobilisation. After serving in this role in World War I, it was not reformed after the war, the role of the original militia no longer existing, and was finally disbanded after a long period of suspended animation in 1953.

== Artillery Militia ==
Northumberland Artillery Militia
- Active: 1864–1909
- Disbanded: 1909
- Country: Great Britain; United Kingdom
- Branch: Militia
- Type: Artillery
- Size: Five Batteries by 1874; Six in 1882

Raised as a coastal artillery battery in 1854, the Northumberland Artillery Militia was first headquartered on Tyneside, then at Berwick-upon-Tweed. Initially it had an establishment of just 161 men of all ranks in two batteries, later rising to six batteries.

During its embodiment during the Crimean War (4 April to 2 March 1861) a group of around 30 militiamen rioted in North Shields, after two of them had been threatened with imprisonment for a drunken assault the previous night, 14 May 1860. In June 28 militiamen and one woman were turned over to the local Magistrates, and the townspeople requested that militia be removed from Tynemouth. The headquarters was moved to Berwick upon Tweed in 1861.

In 1882 it was renamed the 3rd Brigade, Northern Division, Royal Artillery and again in 1889 to the Northumberland Artillery (Western Division) Royal Artillery. After a second, short, period of full-time service from May to October 1900, it was again renamed the Northumberland Royal Garrison Artillery (Militia). It was transferred to the field artillery in 1908 as part of the Special Reserve and disbanded in 1909.

== Volunteers ==
Northumberland Volunteers
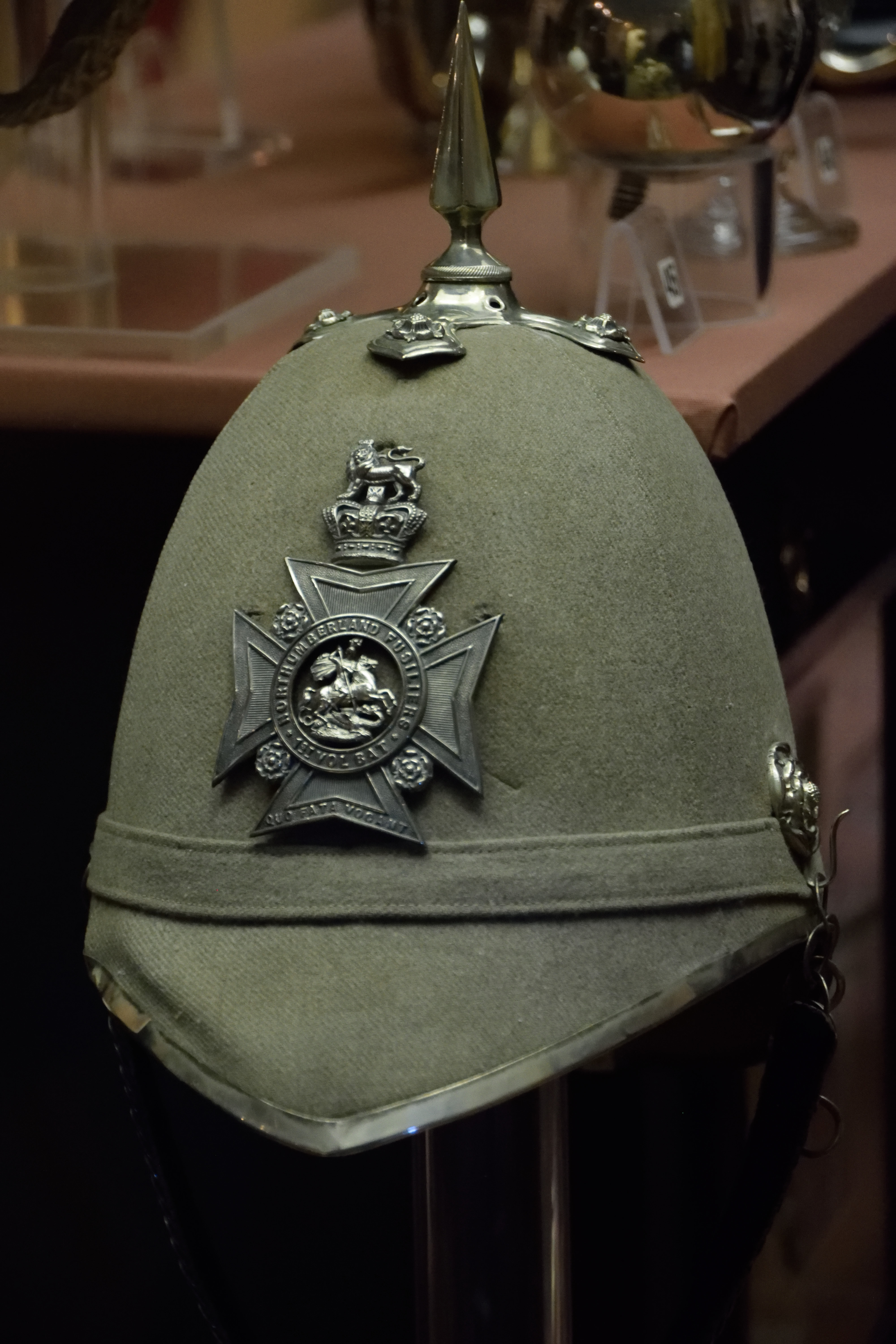
- Service helmet of an officer of the 1st Volunteer Battalion Northumberland Fusiliers 1883–1893. From the Royal Northumberland Fusiliers museum, Alnwick Castle
- Active: 1758–1908
- Disbanded: 1968
- Country: Great Britain; United Kingdom
- Branch: Volunteers
- Type: Artillery, Cavalry, Infantry
- Size: Multiple platoon to company and battalion sized units 1794–1816; Three battalions 1861–1908
- Engagements: Second Boer War

It was initially intended in the Militia Act 1778 to permit volunteers to augment the militia, however only 14 companies had been added nationwide by 1780. In 1782 a new act, the Volunteers Act 1782 (22 Geo. 3. c. 79), allowed raising of volunteer forces by local subscription, with a wealthy land-owners or businessman providing most of the funding, but with the government paying them for any service and allowing the men to be court-marshalled only under volunteer officers.

=== Volunteer Corps ===
Volunteer recruitment early on in the Revolutionary wars proceeded slowly, mostly in the counties most likely to face an invasion. Even with the right to avoid the militia ballot, it remained slow until boosted by the Defence of the Realm Act 1798 (38 Geo. 3. c. 27) which allowed the raising of "Armed Associations". These were again raised by local subscription, with local gentry or a rich businessman providing the bulk of the capital who often commanded the formation. The rank of commandant depended on the number of men in the formation, two of three score for a captain-commandant, up to 500 for a Lt. colonel-commandant.

Early formations (1794-5) were:-

- The Loyal Newcastle Volunteers, 300 to 400 men strong were self-financing and nicknamed the Tinsel Dons on account of their bright uniforms of scarlet with large green facings and gilt buttons, commanded by Colonel Thomas Clennel.
- The Newcastle Armed Association was government supported and was 800 to 1,000 men strong, and included a light infantry company, commanded by Sir Matthew White Ridley, 2nd Baronet.
- The Loyal Berwick Volunteers were four companies strong by 1797, commanded by Major Commandant, later Lt. Colonel Thomas Hall.

Other units raised in 1798 and later were:-

- The Hexham Volunteer Infantry.
- The Morpeth Associated Volunteer Infantry commended by John Bell was 125 strong in 1801. It did not reform in 1803.
- The Wallington and Kirkharle Volunteer Troop of Cavalry
- The Corbridge Volunteer Corps of Infantry from 1804, had a uniform of red with yellow facings and white breeches.
- The Seaton Delaval Associated Corps of Volunteer Infantry, 72 men strong, were funded by Lord Delaval and had plans to evacuate the town and parish by cart.
- The Cheviot Legion combined infantry and cavalry, in 1804 the Legion turned out in full during an invasion scare, despite its seven officers and 84 troopers being scattered over a wide area, and received the title Royal Cheviot Legion as a consequence. It also volunteered to serve outside the county and in 1805 marched to Yorkshire. It was commanded by lt. Colonel Horace St Paul.
- The Coquetdale Rangers were raised in 1799 and continued in existence until 1821. They also responded to the scare of 1804, with the commander, Thomas Selby, riding from Edinburgh to the assembly at Glanton.
- The Coquetdale Troop of Volunteer Cavalry.
- The Loyal Glendale Rangers raised in 1801 at platoon strength were re-raised in 1803 as the larger Glendale Volunteer Infantry together with the Glendale Volunteer Cavalry, both commanded by Major Lord Ossulston.
- The North Shields and Tynemouth Volunteer Infantry.
- The Wallsend Volunteer Rifle Corps trained as light infantry, wearing green tunics with black facings.
- The Berwick Gentlemen Independent Volunteers served without pay and were 89 men strong.
- The Berwick Volunteer Artillery.
- The Bywell Volunteer Yeomanry Cavalry.

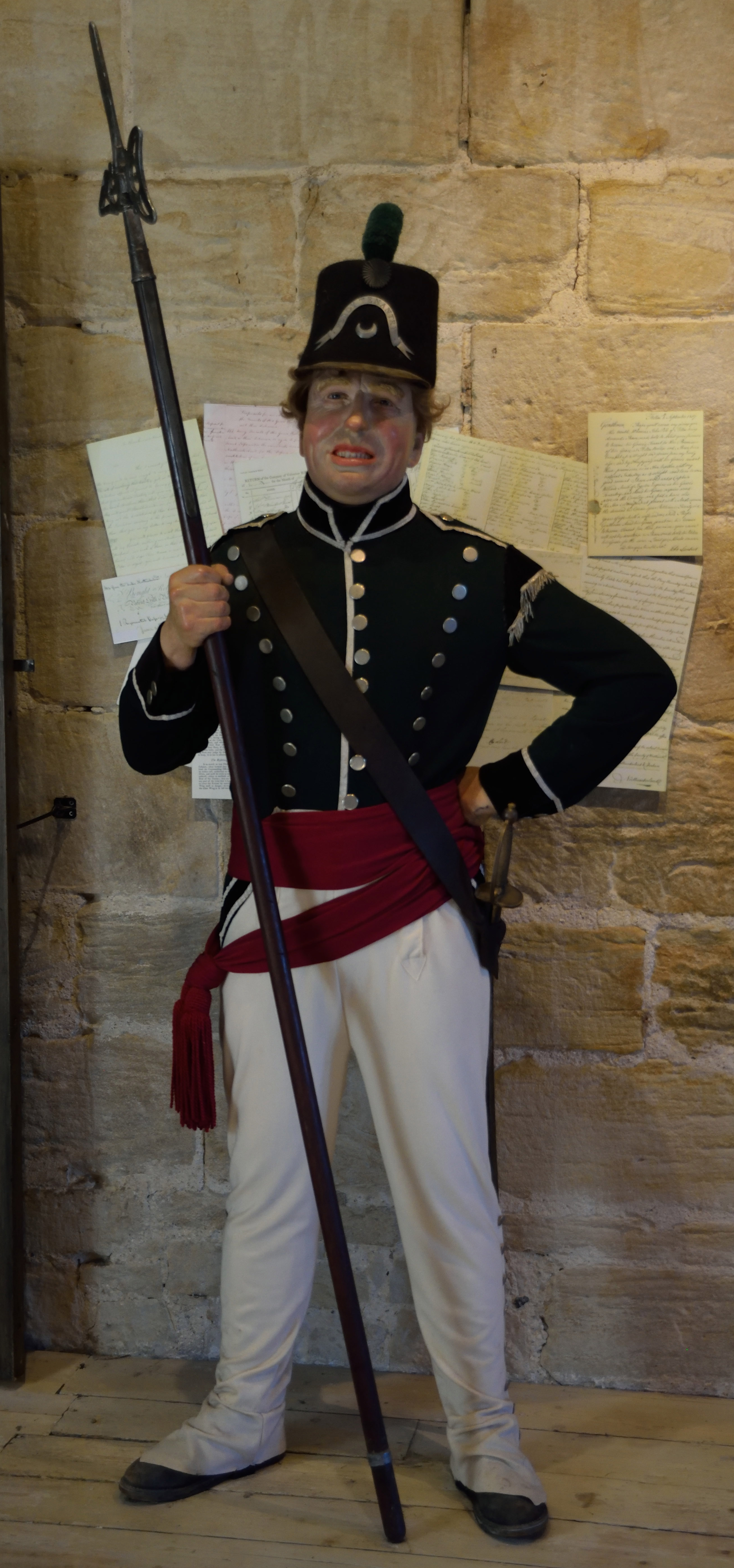
Mannequin in the uniform of a Sergeant Major of the Percy Tenantry Volunteers. From the Percy Tenantry museum, Alnwick Castle.

The largest group was the Percy Tenantry Volunteers raised by Hugh Percy, 2nd Duke of Northumberland in 1798 from his estates in Northumberland and Tyneside, and consisted of two divisions of the Armed Association of the Percy Tenantry Infantry, the Northern, four companies strong, and the Southern, eight companies, and a Percy Tenantry Volunteer Cavalry of five Troops. An attempt by the town of Alnwick to raise an Armed Association met with a hostile, almost feudal, response from the Duke, to the effect that volunteers either joined the Tenantry Volunteers or be "...deprived of his custom, [or discharged] from his employment...". On the reformation of the volunteers in 1803 the strength rose further to six troops of cavalry (at Alnwick, Lesbury, Newham, Newburn, Rothbury, Prudhoe, and Tynemouth, a total of 304 men) and 17 companies of infantry (at Alnwick, Chatton, Guyzance, Thirston, Lesbury, Newham, Rothbury, Shillbottle, Walkworth, Barrasford (two), Lemington, Newburn (two), Prudhoe (two) and Tynemouth, a total strength of 1,195 men). In 1805 a Percy Tenantry Volunteer Artillery Company was formed, attached to the cavalry, with two brass 3-pounders and other equipment supplied by the government. The artillery would not be disbanded with the rest of the tenantry in 1814, but continued with its drills with guns provided by the Duke, becoming the core of the 2nd Northumberland (Percy) Artillery Volunteers in 1860.

==== Local militia ====
Due to the large numbers of small units, and the radical politics of a number of them around the country, they were encouraged to merge into larger local militia battalions by the gradual withdrawal of financial support. Three regiments of the Northumberland Local Militia were formed:-

- Northern Regiment, commanded by Lt.Colonel Horace St Paul, headquartered at Alnwick, 761 men in ten companies.
- Western Regiment, commanded by Lt Colonel Thomas Wentworth Beaumont, headquartered at Hexham, 788 men in ten companies.
- Southern Regiment, commanded by Colonel Commandant Charles William Bigge, headquartered at Morpeth, 765 men in ten companies.

The volunteer associations distant from these locations remained in existence. Aside for training and exercising, none were called out, except for those in 1804 for a false alarm, and by 1818 all of the infantry cavalry and artillery volunteers had disbanded.

==== Yeomanry ====
In 1819, in a climate of economic unrest following the end of the war, the landowners and businessmen raised a corps of Yeomanry, the Northumberland and Newcastle Volunteer Corps of Cavalry, made up of six troops. It was called out on a number of occasions to aid the civil power in keeping the peace, and in 1822 after its annual training was on duty for 23 days during strikes and riots by Tyne keelmen, and again for 33 days in 1831 during pitmen's strikes. While it received official praise for its duty from the Home Secretary, the view from the street was different:

I have frequently seen the military called out in our pitmen and keelmen strikes both yeomanry and regular cavalry. The former were generally a laughing stock to the mob, while the latter were feared and respected. A painted staff [truncheon] with G.R. upon it is more awful in the hands of a special constable, than a sabre in the hands of the same individual, as a yeomanry man.

— John Buddle (agent to Lord Londonderry),

The annual training continued, with a riding school being built in Newcastle in 1847. The annual training became a major social event for the upper classes in the North-East, and the corps roles became ceremonial and social. In 1876 the corps was renamed the Northumberland Hussars. During the Boer War 355 men from the Northumberland Hussars and volunteers from Northumberland and Durham saw service in the 14th, 15th and 55th squadrons of the Imperial Yeomanry.

=== Rifle Volunteers ===
In another invasion scare in 1859 circulars were issued by the government based on the provisions of the 1804 Volunteer Consolidation act for the raising of corps of volunteers in the counties. As an inducement 25 Long Enfield rifles were to be issued by the government for every 100 volunteers, with a corps needing 60 men (effectives) to become established, and candidates for membership having to be approved by the corps committee. membership required a subscription to be paid, with "effectives" who were the backbone of the corps, contributing 10s a year (assistance for the uniform and equipment was given from the general fund if required). A Simple uniform could cost £1 14s, and a rifle £4 10s, with additional costs for other equipment.

As the volunteer corps were predominantly middle class, this placed them in direct competition with the non balloted militia and enticed many of the landed gentry in search of commissions away and left the militia almost the preserve of the working class.

The new volunteer corps, raised between 1861 and 1878 included:

- 1st Berwick-upon-Tweed
- 1st Newcastle upon Tyne
- 1st Northumberland, Tynemouth
- 2nd Northumberland, Hexham
- 3rd Northumberland, Morpeth
- 4th Northumberland, Wooler-in-Glendale (later at Belford)
- 5th Northumberland, Alnwick
- 6th Northumberland, Bellingham
- 7th Northumberland, Allendale
- 8th Northumberland, Walker
- 9th Northumberland, Cramlington
- 10th Northumberland, Lowick
- 11th Northumberland, St John Lee (later at Sandhoe then Corbridge)
- 12th Northumberland, Haltwhistle

In August 1861 these formed (on paper) the 1st and 2nd Administrative Battalions of the Northumberland Rifle Volunteers. Forming another administrative battalion was the large 1st Newcastle upon Tyne Rifle Volunteer Corps, with a uniform of steel grey with black facings, based on an earlier Armed Association raised in 1839, which already included a Highland sub-division. (Note: In December 1859 the Corps had seven companies, with an eighth being raised, they were the Temperance, Kilted, Quayside, Oddfellows and Guards, and companies from the works of Messrs Stephenson, W. G. Armstrong and the Hampton Factory. The new company drilled in the riding school of the Yeomanry.)

=== Volunteer Artillery ===
Alongside the Rifle Volunteers, Artillery Volunteers were also formed:

- 1st Northumberland (Tynemouth) Artillery Volunteers. Formed in August 1859 in Tynemouth, it was first in order of precedence for the artillery volunteers. Its first practice in November was on two muzzle-loading 12-pounder cannon at Tynemouth Castle that had not been fired for 70 years. They originally wore the same grey uniform as the Newcastle Rifle Volunteers as they were raised at the same time of one of its original companies (Tynemouth). By the end of the 1870s, six batteries had been raised. During the Boer War the corps supplied 130 men for the Elswick Battery, which was the only Volunteer Artillery unit to serve there. The men of the battery won one D.S.O., one D.C.M. and two M.i.D.s. (Note: This unit evolved, after a War Office re-organisation, to become the Tynemouth Artillery Volunteers in 1881 and was based at the Old Drill Hall, Military Road, North Shields (demolished in 2000).)
- 2nd Northumberland (Percy) Artillery Volunteers Formed in February 1860 from the remains of the Duke's Tenantry Artillery of 1805, it initially using a 32-pounder for practice on the sands of Alnmouth, and recruited from the rural areas around Alnwick. In 1882 a detachment competed at Shoeburyness winning the Challenge Cup, the Lords and Commons Prize and Her Majesty the Queen's Prize. In January 1901 the corps was re-designated 2nd Northumberland (Percy) Royal Garrison Artillery Volunteers; this change in role, together with the changing population patterns in an increasingly mechanised agricultural industry, caused the disbanding of the corps in October 1902.
- 3rd Northumberland (Newcastle) Artillery Volunteers. Formed in the spring of 1860 the corps quickly reach six batteries by 1863. It was initially armed with 18- and 24-pounder muzzle-loading cannon. It was later to receive two 40-pounder breech-loading guns. (Note: This unit evolved, after a War Office re-organisation, to become the 1st Northumberland Artillery Volunteers in 1881 and was based at Barrack Road in Newcastle upon Tyne by around 1890.)
- 1st Berwick-on-Tweed Artillery Volunteer Corps. Formed in February 1859 the corps consisted of only two batteries.

=== Volunteer Engineers ===
In September 1860 a Corps of Engineer Volunteers was raised from men of the Armstrong factories at Elswick and attached to the Newcastle Rifle Volunteers. It would eventually become the 1st Newcastle Engineers.

=== Reform and amalgamation ===
After being brigaded with the militia and the regulars' depot from 1873, but still having little interaction with them, and still with each other, in 1881 the Administrative battalions were renamed from:

- 1st Administrative Battalion, Northumberland Rifle Volunteers — Northumberland & Berwick upon Tweed Volunteers
- 2nd Administrative Battalion Northumberland Rifle Volunteers — 2nd Northumberland Volunteer Battalion
- 1st Newcastle upon Tyne Rifle Volunteer Corps — 1st Newcastle Volunteer Battalion

In 1881 with the amalgamation of the regulars, militia and volunteers into the Northumberland Fusiliers, the use of regular officers (occasionally from the Northumberland Fusiliers) as battalion adjutant began, beginning a closer connection to the regulars of the new territorial regiment. In 1887 the Rifle Volunteers were renamed as Volunteer Battalions of the Northumberland Fusiliers in numerical order:

- Northumberland & Berwick upon Tweed Volunteers — 1st Volunteer Battalion
- 2nd Northumberland Volunteer Battalion — 2nd Volunteer Battalion
- 1st Newcastle Volunteer Battalion — 3rd Volunteer Battalion

About this time annual battalion camps became usual, with the 1st Volunteer battalion being part of the first brigade camp (with the 1st, 2nd and 4th volunteer battalion of the D.L.I. forming the Tyne and Tees Brigade) held at Ripon in May 1893.

During the Boer War each of the three battalions provided 70 to 80 volunteers for a special service company, for one years service to reinforce the county regiment in South Africa. These attachments greatly increased the connections between the volunteers and the county regiment, and coupled with another invasion scare caused by the small numbers of regular troops left in the country, caused a surge in volunteer numbers.

=== Haldane Reforms ===
As part the reforms to the volunteers, and in return for increased financial support on an often heavy burden on the commanding officer, the volunteer would undertake a regular annual camp and a training obligation of six months if mobilised, with the volunteer battalions coming under the control of the newly formed county association. As the reforms were announced in the prelude to the formation of the Territorial Force there was a fall in numbers joining the volunteers. (Note: The strength of the new 6th (City) Battalion fell from 700 to 225 men on 1 April.)

On 31 March the Volunteer Force was dissolved and the next day the Territorial Force put in place with the battalions under the control of the county association. The volunteer battalions were renumbered, in sequence after the old militia battalion, (the 1st Volunteer Battalion being split to form the 4th and the 7th battalions) as the 4th to 7th Battalions of the Northumberland Fusiliers. They were formed into the Northumberland Brigade, part of the Northumbrian Division. (Note: The division and brigades would not be numbered until April 1915, receiving higher numbers than the more recently formed New Army formations.)

On this day the 1st (Tynemouth) Volunteer Artillery became the Tynemouth Garrison Artillery, and the remainder, together with the volunteer artillery from County Durham, became the artillery brigades of the Northumbrian Division.

== Bibliography ==
- Beckett, Ian F W (2011). Britain's Part Time Soldiers. The Amateur Military Tradition 1558—1945 (2 ed.). Barnsley: Pen & Sword. ISBN 9781848843950.
- Hewitson, T L (2006). Weekend Warriors. From Tyne to Tweed (1 ed.). Stroud: Tempus. ISBN 9780752437569.
- Knight, Roger (2014). Britain Against Napoleon. The Organization of Victory 1793—1815 (1 ed.). London: Penguin Books. ISBN 9780141038940.
- Litchfield, Norman E.H., (1987). The Militia Artillery 1852–1909 (Their Lineage, Uniforms and Badges), Nottingham: Sherwood Press, ISBN 0-9508205-1-2.
- Ray Westlake, Tracing the Rifle Volunteers, Barnsley: Pen and Sword, 2010, ISBN 978-1-84884-211-3.
