= Defence of the Realm Act 1803 =

Act of the Parliament of the United Kingdom

- Act of Parliament
- Parliament of the United Kingdom
- Long title: An Act to enable his Majesty more effectually to provide for the Defence and Security of the Realm during the present War; and for indemnifying Persons who may suffer in their Property by such Measures as may be necessary for that Purpose.
- Citation: 43 Geo. 3. c. 55
- Introduced by: Charles Philip Yorke (Commons)
- Territorial extent: United Kingdom

Dates
- Royal assent: 11 June 1803
- Commencement: 11 June 1803 (Note: The Acts of Parliament (Commencement) Act 1793.)
- Repealed: 6 August 1872
Other legislation
Amended by	Levy en Masse Act 1803; Defence of the Realm Act 1806
Repealed by	Statute Law Revision Act 1872
Relates to	Defence of the Realm Act 1798; Defence of the Realm Act 1806; Defence of the Realm Act 1914

Status: Repealed

Text of statute as originally enacted

The Defence of the Realm Act 1803 (43 Geo. 3 c. 55) was an act of the Parliament of the United Kingdom. The act was bought before the House of Commons on 18 May 1803 by Charles Philip Yorke, then Secretary at War in the Addington ministry. The act required all counties to a full report on all able-bodied men aged between fifteen and sixty, classifying those in the volunteer regiments, those willing to serve, to drive waggons or act as guides, as well as the details of waggons, boats, horses, cattle, food and forage.

== Subsequent developments ==
The whole act was repealed by section 1 of, and the schedule to, the Statute Law Revision Act 1872 (35 & 36 Vict. c. 63), which came into force on 6 August 1872.
