= St John the Baptist Parish Church, Alnmouth =

St John the Baptist’s Church, Alnmouth
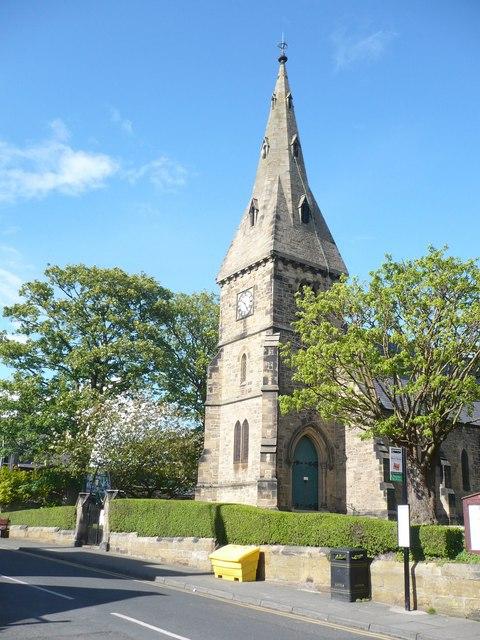
- St John the Baptist’s Church, Alnmouth
- St John the Baptist’s Church, Alnmouth
- 55°23′18.52″N 1°36′44.24″W
- OS grid reference: NU 24658 10563
- Location: Alnmouth
- Country: England
- Denomination: Church of England

History
- Dedication: St John the Baptist

Architecture
- Heritage designation: Grade II listed

Administration
- Diocese: Diocese of Newcastle
- Archdeaconry: Lindisfarne
- Deanery: Alnwick
- Parish: Lesbury with Alnmouth

St John the Baptist Parish Church is an Anglican place of worship situated in the village of Alnmouth in Northumberland, England. It is the parish church for the Alnmouth area and is within the Diocese of Newcastle. The church is a Grade II listed building.

== History ==
=== Early churches ===
The present church is the third to be built in the village, the first church stood on Church Hill, the site where Saint Cuthbert was said to have agreed to being elected Bishop of Hexham in the year 684 at the Synod of Twyford (Saxon “Aetiwifordia”). The church was built by the first Norman Earl of Northumbria around the time of Alnmouth's foundation in the 12th century and named in honour of Saint Waleric. This church declined rapidly in the 16th century as a result of the Dissolution of the Monasteries, additionally it was gradually destroyed as the River Aln changed course over a period of time and was finally brought down in the great storm of Christmas 1806. From 1859 a temporary chapel was created for worship in the town at Hindmarsh Hall, an old granary, and this was used until a new church could be built.

=== Present day church ===
The present day Church of St John the Baptist was built at a site on Northumberland Street on land given by Algernon Percy, 6th Duke of Northumberland, the building cost £2,595 which was raised by public subscription. The church was consecrated by Charles Baring Bishop of Durham on Tuesday 6 November 1876. Two months later, on 7 February 1877, Alnmouth became a separate parish when it was divided from the parish of Lesbury.

In 1878-79 the church clock along with its five bells and single tolling bell were fitted, all six bells were recast, retuned and re-hung in 1936. In 1880, just four years after construction was finished, the church was enlarged by the addition of the south transept, this was done to accommodate the growing number of pupils at the nearby Seabank School who needed to use the church for their religious education as well as worship. The Gothic window which was removed during these alterations can now be seen outside the church, standing as an archway facing the sea.

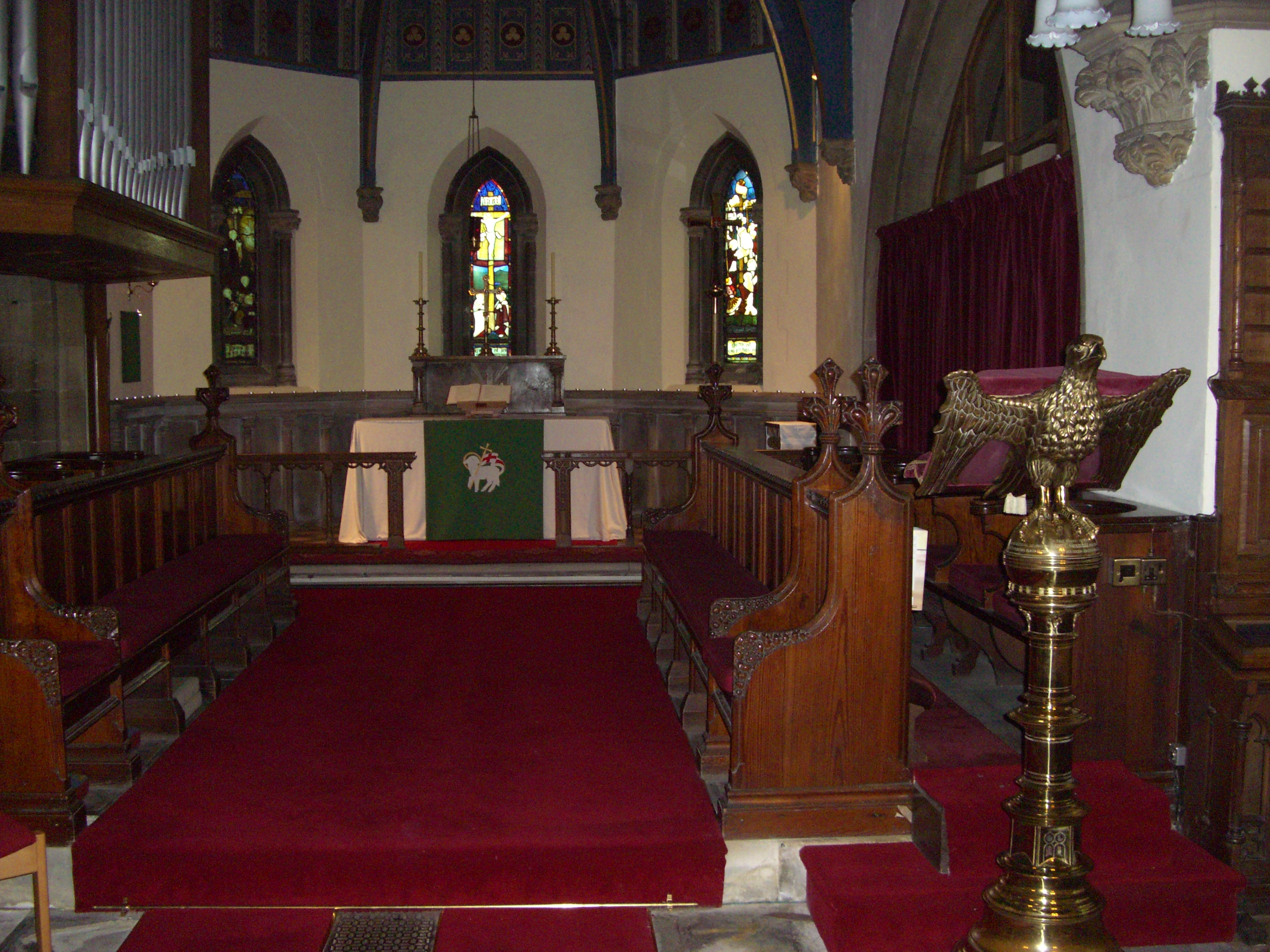
The sanctuary area with the organ to the left and the eagle lectern to the right

== Architecture ==
=== Exterior ===
The church is constructed from snecked tooled stone with tooled ashlar quoins and dressings and consists of chancel, nave, north aisle, north and south porches, and an embattled western tower with spire. The tower is constructed with three stages, the first stage consists of a double doored main entrance with west facing double window, the second stage has lancet windows while the third stage has slatted belfry openings and clock. The stone spire on top of the tower tapers from square to octagonal and contains small gabled lucarnes.

=== Interior ===
The entrance porch beneath the tower contains a replica of the Alnmouth Cross, the cross was found on Church Hill in the 1780s and has been dated to the 9th or 10th centuries. The cross’ lay out and style link it clearly with Lindisfarne Priory. The original cross is now in the Museum of Antiquities at Newcastle upon Tyne. The pulpit is a memorial to those killed in World War I and is carved with the soldier saints: Saint Oswald, Saint Maurice, Saint Martin and Saint George. The best examples of stained glass windows are in the apse, these being good representations of the early work of Charles Eamer Kempe, the rest of the windows are almost all modern, portraying saintly monks and were designed by C. Evetts. The sanctuary ceiling is significant because of its shape and decoration, it has the church organ on its left hand side.
