= Defence of the Realm Act 1914 =

Act of the Parliament of the United Kingdom

Defence of the Realm Act 1914 (Note: Section 2.)
- Act of Parliament
- Parliament of the United Kingdom
- Long title: An Act to confer on His Majesty in Council power to make Regulations during the present War for the Defence of the Realm.
- Citation: 4 & 5 Geo. 5. c. 29
- Territorial extent: United Kingdom

Dates
- Royal assent: 8 August 1914
- Commencement: 8 August 1914 (Note: The Acts of Parliament (Commencement) Act 1793.)
- Repealed: 27 November 1914
Other legislation
Amended by	Defence of the Realm (No. 2) Act 1914; Defence of the Realm Act 1915
Repealed by	Defence of the Realm Consolidation Act 1914
Relates to	Defence of the Realm Act 1803; Defence of the Realm Act 1803; Defence of the Realm Act 1806

Status: Repealed

Text of statute as originally enacted

The Defence of the Realm Act 1914 (4 & 5 Geo. 5. c. 29), also known as the DORA, was an act of the Parliament of the United Kingdom passed on 8 August 1914, four days after the country entered the First World War. It was added to as the war progressed. It gave the government wide-ranging powers during the war, such as the power to requisition buildings or land needed for the war effort, and to make regulations creating criminal offences.

DORA ushered in a variety of authoritarian social control mechanisms, such as censorship:

"No person shall by word of mouth or in writing spread reports likely to cause disaffection or alarm among any of His Majesty's forces or among the civilian population"

Anti-war activists, including John MacLean, Willie Gallacher, John William Muir, and Bertrand Russell, were sent to prison. The film, The Dop Doctor, was prohibited under the act by the South African government with the justification that its portrayal of Boers during the Siege of Mafeking would antagonise Afrikaners.

The activities no longer permitted included flying kites, starting bonfires, buying binoculars, feeding wild animals bread, discussing naval and military matters and buying alcohol on public transport. Alcoholic drinks were watered down and pub opening times were restricted to 12 noon–3pm and 6:30pm–9:30pm. (The requirement for an afternoon gap in permitted hours lasted in England until the Licensing Act 1988.)

In 1920 DORA was extended to deal with the violence in Ireland (see Irish War of Independence) with the Restoration of Order in Ireland Act 1920 (10 & 11 Geo. 5. c. 31). Section 3(6) of that act allowed military authorities to jail any Irish person without charge or trial and was repealed in 1953.

== Purpose ==
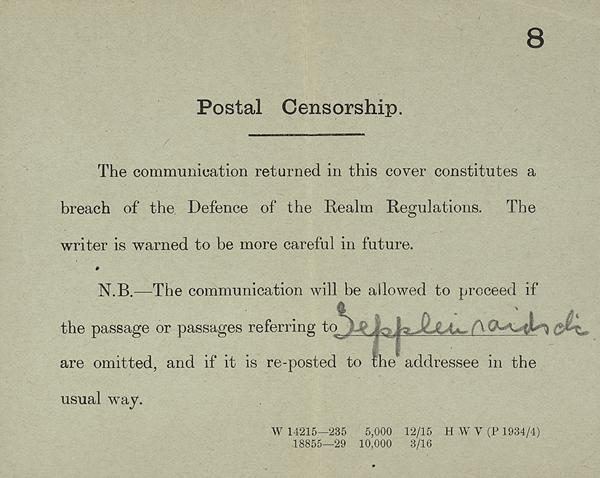
Example of censorship under the act of comments about Zeppelin raids in mail

Like most wartime acts, the Defence of the Realm Act was designed to help prevent potential invasion and to keep homeland morale at a high. It imposed censorship of journalism and of letters coming home from the front line. The press was subject to controls on reporting troop movements, numbers or any other operational information that would potentially be exploited by the Central Powers. People who breached the regulations with intent to assist the enemy or not would have been sentenced to death. 10 people were executed under the regulations.

== Amendments ==
Section 1(1) of the act read as follows:

(1) His Majesty in Council has power during the continuance of the present war to issue regulations as to the powers and duties of the Admiralty and Army Council, and of the members of His Majesty's forces, and other persons acting in His behalf, for securing the public safety and the defence of the realm; and may, by such regulations, authorise the trial by courts martial and punishment of persons contravening any of the provisions of such regulations designed—

(a) To prevent persons communicating with the enemy or obtaining information for that purpose or any purpose calculated to jeopardise the success of the operations of any of His Majesty's forces or to assist the enemy; or
(b) To secure the safety of any means of communication, or of railways, docks or harbours; in like manner as if such persons were subject to military law and had on active service committed an offence under section 5 of the Army Act.

Defence of the Realm (No. 2) Act 1914 (Note: Section 2)
- Act of Parliament
- Parliament of the United Kingdom
- Long title: An Act to amend the Defence of the Realm Act, 1914.
- Citation: 4 & 5 Geo. 5. c. 63
- Territorial extent: United Kingdom

Dates
- Royal assent: 28 August 1914
- Commencement: 28 August 1914
- Repealed: 27 November 1914
Other legislation
Amends	Defence of the Realm Act 1914
Repealed by	Defence of the Realm Consolidation Act 1914

Status: Repealed

Text of statute as originally enacted

Defence of the Realm (Amendment) Act 1915 (Note: Section 3.)
- Act of Parliament
- Parliament of the United Kingdom
- Long title: An Act to amend the Defence of the Realm Consolidation Act, 1914.
- Citation: 5 & 6 Geo. 5. c. 34
- Territorial extent: United Kingdom

Dates
- Royal assent: 16 March 1915
- Commencement: 16 March 1915
- Repealed: 22 December 1927
Other legislation
Amends	Defence of the Realm Consolidation Act 1914
Repealed by	Statute Law Revision Act 1927
Relates to	Defence of the Realm (Amendment), No. 2, Act 1915; Defence of the Realm (Amendment) (No. 3) Act 1915

Status: Repealed

Text of statute as originally enacted

Defence of the Realm (Amendment), No. 2, Act 1915 (Note: Section 2)
- Act of Parliament
- Parliament of the United Kingdom
- Long title: An Act to amend the Defence of the Realm Consolidation Act, 1914.
- Citation: 5 & 6 Geo. 5. c. 37
- Territorial extent: United Kingdom

Dates
- Royal assent: 16 March 1915
- Commencement: 16 March 1915
- Repealed: 22 December 1927
Other legislation
Amends	Defence of the Realm Consolidation Act 1914
Repealed by	Statute Law Revision Act 1927
Relates to	Defence of the Realm (Amendment) Act 1915; Defence of the Realm (Amendment) (No. 3) Act 1915

Status: Repealed

Text of statute as originally enacted

Defence of the Realm (Amendment) (No. 3) Act 1915 (Note: Section 2)
- Act of Parliament
- Parliament of the United Kingdom
- Long title: An Act to extend the Defence of the Realm Consolidation Act, 1914.
- Citation: 5 & 6 Geo. 5. c. 42
- Territorial extent: United Kingdom

Dates
- Royal assent: 19 May 1915
- Commencement: 19 May 1915
- Repealed: England and Wales and Scotland: 31 August 1921; Northern Ireland: 18 December 1953
Other legislation
Amends	Defence of the Realm Consolidation Act 1914
Repealed by	England and Wales and Scotland: Licensing Act 1921; Northern Ireland: Statute Law Revision Act 1953
Relates to	Defence of the Realm (Amendment) Act 1915; Defence of the Realm (Amendment), No. 2, Act 1915

Status: Repealed

Text of statute as originally enacted

The original act was amended and extended six times over the course of the war, first on 28 August 1914 by the Defence of the Realm (No. 2) Act 1914 (4 & 5 Geo. 5. c. 63), then on 27 November 1914 by the Defence of the Realm Consolidation Act 1914 (5 & 6 Geo. 5. c. 8), which repealed and replaced the previous acts. It was amended three times in 1915, by the Defence of the Realm (Amendment) Act 1915 (5 & 6 Geo. 5. c. 34), the Defence of the Realm (Amendment), No. 2, Act 1915 (5 & 6 Geo. 5. c. 37) and the Defence of the Realm (Amendment) (No. 3) Act 1915 (5 & 6 Geo. 5. c. 42).

The Defence of the Realm Consolidation Act 1914 (5 & 6 Geo. 5. c. 8) contained the following:

(1) His Majesty in Council has power during the continuance of the present war to issue regulations for securing the public safety and the defence of the realm, and as to the powers and duties for that purpose of the Admiralty and Army Council and of the members of His Majesty's forces and other persons acting in his behalf; and may by such regulations authorise the trial by courts-martial, or in the case of minor offences by courts of summary jurisdiction, and punishment of persons committing offences against the regulations and in particular against any of the provisions of such regulations designed:

(a) to prevent persons communicating with the enemy or obtaining information for that purpose or any purpose calculated to jeopardise the success of the operations of any of His Majesty's forces or the forces of his allies or to assist the enemy; or
(b) to secure the safety of His Majesty's forces and ships and the safety of any means of communication and of railways, ports, and harbours; or
(c) to prevent the spread of false reports or reports likely to cause disaffection to His Majesty or to interfere with the success of His Majesty's forces by land or sea or to prejudice His Majesty's relations with foreign powers; or
(d) to secure the navigation of vessels in accordance with directions given by or under the authority of the Admiralty; or
(e) otherwise to prevent assistance being given to the enemy or the successful prosecution of the war being endangered.

(3) It shall be lawful for the Admiralty or Army Council:

(a) to require that there shall be placed at their disposal the whole or any part of the output of any factory or workshop in which arms, ammunition, or warlike stores and equipment, or any articles required for the production thereof, are manufactured;
(b) to take possession of, and use for the purpose of, His Majesty's naval or military service any such factory or workshop or any plant thereof;

== Similar legislation ==
Emergency wartime/postwar legislation by era and jurisdiction
Era	Jurisdiction	Legislation
World War I	Australia	War Precautions Act
World War I	Canada	War Measures Act 1914
World War I	India	Defence of India Act 1915
World War I	USA	Espionage Act of 1917; Sedition Act of 1918
Post-WWI	UK	Emergency Powers Act 1920; Restoration of Order in Ireland Act 1920
World War II	Canada	National Resources Mobilization Act
World War II	Ireland	Emergency Powers Act 1939
World War II	UK	Emergency Powers (Defence) Act 1939; Treachery Act 1940

== See also ==
- Munitions of War Act 1915
