= List of acts of the Parliament of Ireland, 1731–1740 =

This is a list of acts of the Parliament of Ireland for the years from 1731 to 1740.

The number shown by each act's title is its chapter number. Acts are cited using this number, preceded by the years of the reign during which the relevant parliamentary session was held; thus the act concerning assay passed in 1783 is cited as "23 & 24 Geo. 3. c. 23", meaning the 23rd act passed during the session that started in the 23rd year of the reign of George III and which finished in the 24th year of that reign. Note that the modern convention is to use Arabic numerals in citations (thus "40 Geo. 3" rather than "40 Geo. III"). Acts of the reign of Elizabeth I are formally cited without a regnal numeral in the Republic of Ireland.

Acts passed by the Parliament of Ireland did not have a short title; however, some of these acts have subsequently been given a short title by acts of the Parliament of the United Kingdom, acts of the Parliament of Northern Ireland, or acts of the Oireachtas. This means that some acts have different short titles in the Republic of Ireland and Northern Ireland respectively. Official short titles are indicated by the flags of the respective jurisdictions.

A number of the acts included in this list are still in force in Northern Ireland or the Republic of Ireland. Because these two jurisdictions are entirely separate, the version of an act in force in one may differ from the version in force in the other; similarly, an act may have been repealed in one but not in the other.

A number of acts passed by the Parliament of England or the Parliament of Great Britain also extended to Ireland during this period.

== 5 Geo. 2 (1731) ==
The 3rd session of the parliament of George II, which met from 5 October 1731 until 10 March 1732.

This session was also traditionally cited as 5 G. 2.

=== Public acts ===
Short title, or popular name	Citation	Royal assent
Long title
Import Duties Act 1731 (repealed)	5 Geo. 2. c. 1 (I)	18 December 1731
An Act for granting and continuing to his Majesty an additional duty on beer, ale, strong waters, wine, tobacco, and other goods and merchandizes therein mentioned. (Repealed by Statute Law Revision (Ireland) Act 1878 (41 & 42 Vict. c. 57))
Import Duties, Pensions Tax, and Loan Act 1731 (repealed)	5 Geo. 2. c. 2 (I)	18 December 1731
An Act for granting to his Majesty a further additional duty on wine, silk, hops, china, earthen, japaned, or lacquered ware, and vinegar; and also a tax of four shillings in the pound on all salaries, profits of employments, fees and pensions, to be applied to pay an interest of five pounds per cent. per annum for the sum of three hundred thousand pounds, and towards the discharge of the said principal sum. (Repealed by Statute Law Revision (Ireland) Act 1878 (41 & 42 Vict. c. 57))
Revenue Act 1731 (repealed)	5 Geo. 2. c. 3 (I)	10 March 1732
An Act for the better securing and collecting his Majesty's revenue. (Repealed by Statute Law Revision (Ireland) Act 1878 (41 & 42 Vict. c. 57))
Security of Trade Act 1731^{(Republic of Ireland)}	5 Geo. 2. c. 4 (I)	10 March 1732
An Act for the further explaining and amending the several Laws for preventing Frauds committed by Tenants; and for the more easy Renewal of Leases; and for the further Amendment of the Law in certain Cases therein mentioned.
Oaths of Qualification (Indemnity) Act 1731 (repealed)	5 Geo. 2. c. 5 (I)	10 March 1732
An Act for allowing further time to persons in offices to qualify themselves pursuant to an act, intituled, "An Act to prevent the further growth of popery." (Note: Popery Act 1703 (2 Anne c. 6 (I))) (Repealed by Statute Law Revision (Ireland) Act 1878 (41 & 42 Vict. c. 57))
Expiring and Amending Statutes Act 1731 (repealed)	5 Geo. 2. c. 6 (I)	10 March 1732
An Act for continuing several temporary Statutes made in this Kingdom, and now near expiring, and for further Amendment of the Statutes therein mentioned. (Repealed by Statute Law Revision (Ireland) Act 1878 (41 & 42 Vict. c. 57))
Pawnbrokers Act 1731^{(Republic of Ireland)} (repealed)	5 Geo. 2. c. 7 (I)	10 March 1732
An Act for reducing the Interest of Money to Six per Cent. (Repealed by Usury Laws Repeal Act 1854 (17 & 18 Vict. c. 90))
Idiots, Lunatics, and Trustees Act 1731	5 Geo. 2. c. 8 (I)	10 March 1732
An Act to enable Ideots and Lunaticks, who are seized or possessed of Estates in Fee, or for Lives, or Terms of Years, in Trust or by way of Mortgage, to make Conveyances, Surrenders, or Assignments of Estates; and to prevent Delay in Suits in Equity where Trustees cannot be found.
Land Improvement Act 1731	5 Geo. 2. c. 9 (I)	10 March 1732
An Act to encourage the Improvement of barren and waste Land and Boggs, and planting of Timber Trees and Orchards. (Repealed for the Republic of Ireland by Statute Law Revision (Pre-Union Irish Statutes) Act 1962 (No. 29))
Lead and Iron Stealing Act 1731 (repealed)	5 Geo. 2. c. 10 (I)	10 March 1732
An Act for the more effectual punishing Stealers of Lead or Iron Bars fixed to Houses, or any Fences belonging thereunto. (Repealed by Criminal Statutes (Ireland) Repeal Act 1828 (9 Geo. 4. c. 53))
Inland Navigation Act 1731^{(Republic of Ireland)}	5 Geo. 2. c. 11 (I)	10 March 1732
An Act for explaining and amending an Act made in the Twenty eighth Year of the Reign of King Henry the Eighth, intituled, "An act for the Wears upon the Barrow, and other Waters in the County of Kilkenny." (Note: Inland Navigation Act 1537 (28 Hen. 8. c. 22 (I)))
Fireworks Act 1731 (repealed)	5 Geo. 2. c. 12 (I)	10 March 1732
An Act to prevent the throwing or firing of Squibs, Serpents, and other Fire-works. (Repealed by Gunpowder Act 1860 (23 & 24 Vict. c. 139))
Seamen in Merchant Service Act 1731 (repealed)	5 Geo. 2. c. 13 (I)	10 March 1732
An Act for the better Regulation and Government of Seamen in the Merchants Service. (Repealed by Statute Law Revision (Ireland) Act 1878 (41 & 42 Vict. c. 57))
Dublin Workhouse, Poor, and Lunatics Amendment Act 1731	5 Geo. 2. c. 14 (I)	10 March 1732
An Act to explain and amend an act, intituled, "An Act for the better regulating the work-house of the city of Dublin, and to regulate and provide for the poor thereof, and to prevent mischiefs which may happen by keeping gun-powder within the said city;" (Note: Dublin Workhouse, Poor, and Gunpowder Act 1727 (1 Geo. 2. c. 27 (I)))) and also for explaining and amending one other act, intituled, "An Act for the better enabling the governors of the work-house of the city of Dublin to provide for and employ the poor therein, and for the more effectual punishment of vagabonds; and also for the better securing of and providing for lunaticks and foundling children." (Note: Dublin Workhouse, Poor, and Lunatics Act 1729 (3 Geo. 2. c. 17 (I)))
Dublin to Dunleer Road Act 1731	5 Geo. 2. c. 15 (I)	10 March 1732
An act for repairing the road leading from the city of Dublin (Note: Dublin.) to the town of Dunleer (Note: Dunleer, County Louth.) in the county of Lowth.
Dublin to Kinnegad Road Act 1731	5 Geo. 2. c. 16 (I)	10 March 1732
An Act for repairing the Road leading from the City of Dublin, to the Town of Kinnegad (Note: Kinnegad, County Westmeath.) in the County of West-Meath.
Black Bull to Athboy Road Act 1731	5 Geo. 2. c. 17 (I)	10 March 1732
An act for repairing the road leading from the Black-Bull in the county of Meath, to the town of Athboy (Note: Athboy, County Meath.) in the said county.
Kilcullen to County Kilkenny Road Act 1731	5 Geo. 2. c. 18 (I)	10 March 1732
An Act for repairing the Road leading from the town of Kilcullen (Note: Kilcullen, County Kildare.) in the County of Kildare to the County of Kilkenny.
Kilkenny to Clonmel Road Act 1731	5 Geo. 2. c. 19 (I)	10 March 1732
An Act for repairing the road leading from the city of Kilkenny (Note: Kilkenny, County Kilkenny.) to the town of Clonmell (Note: Clonmel, County Tipperary.) in the county of Tipperary.
Cork to Kilworth Mountain Road Act 1731	5 Geo. 2. c. 20 (I)	10 March 1732
An Act for repairing the Road leading from the city of Cork (Note: Cork, County Cork.) to the Brook which bounds the Counties of Cork and Tipperary near the Foot of Kilworth Mountain.
Naas to Maryborough Road Act 1731	5 Geo. 2. c. 21 (I)	10 March 1732
An Act for repairing the road leading from the town of Naas (Note: Naas, County Kildare.) in the county of Kildare to the town of Maryborough (Note: Portlaoise, County Laois.) in the Queen's county.
Newcastle, Limerick, and Cork Road Act 1731	5 Geo. 2. c. 22 (I)	10 March 1732
An Act for repairing the Road leading from the town of New-Castle (Note: Newcastle West, County Limerick.) in the County of Limerick to the City of Limerick, (Note: Limerick, County Limerick.) and from thence to the City of Cork.

=== Private acts ===
Short title, or popular name	Citation	Royal assent
Long title
Boyle's Estate Act 1731	5 Geo. 2. c. 1 Pr. (I)	10 March 1732
An Act to enable Bellingham Boyle, esquire, to make leases, and settle a jointure upon any woman he shall marry, out of the towns, lands, tenements, and hereditaments comprised in his grandfather's settlement.
St Leger's Estate Act 1731	5 Geo. 2. c. 2 Pr. (I)	10 March 1732
An Act to enable Hayes St Leger, esquire, and Elizabeth St Leger, alias Deane, his wife, to sell the estate of said Elizabeth, lying dispersed in the counties of Dublin, Meath, Kilkenny, and Wexford, far distant from the said Hayes St Ledger's estate and place of residence in the county of Cork, and with the money arising by such sale to purchase other lands more contiguous, to be settled to same uses, to which the said lands so to be sold are limited.

=== Sources ===
- "Acts of Parliament by Session: 1731". Irish Legislation Database. Queen's University Belfast.
- "Pre-Union Irish Statutes: 1731 Acts". Irish Statute Book. Attorney General of Ireland.

== 7 Geo. 2 (1733) ==
The 4th session of the parliament of George II, which met from 4 October 1733 until 29 April 1734.

This session was also traditionally cited as 7 G. 2.

=== Public acts ===
Short title, or popular name	Citation	Royal assent
Long title
Import Duties Act 1733 (repealed)	7 Geo. 2. c. 1 (I)	17 December 1733
An Act for granting and continuing to his Majesty an additional duty on beer, ale, strong waters, wine, tobacco, and other goods and merchandizes therein mentioned. (Repealed by Statute Law Revision (Ireland) Act 1878 (41 & 42 Vict. c. 57))
Import Duties, Pensions Tax, and Loan Act 1733 (repealed)	7 Geo. 2. c. 2 (I)	17 December 1733
An Act for granting to his Majesty a further additional duty on wine, silk, hops, china, earthen, japaned, or lacquered ware, and vinegar; and also a tax of four shillings in the pound on all salaries, profits of employments, fees, and pensions to be applied to pay an interest of five pounds per cent. per annum for the sum of three hundred thousand pounds, or such part thereof as shall remain unpaid on the twenty fifth day of December one thousand seven hundred and thirty three, and towards the discharge of the said principal sum. (Repealed by Statute Law Revision (Ireland) Act 1878 (41 & 42 Vict. c. 57))
Customs and Excise Frauds Act 1733 (repealed)	7 Geo. 2. c. 3 (I)	29 April 1734
An Act for continuing and amending an act, intituled, "An Act for the more effectual preventing several frauds and abuses committed in his Majesty's customs and excise; and for settling the rates of certain goods and merchandizes not particularly valued in the book of rates;" (Note: Customs and Excise Frauds Act 1727 (1 Geo. 2. c. 6 (I))) and for continuing and amending an act, intituled, "An Act for the better securing and collecting his Majesty's revenue;" (Note: Revenue Act 1731 (5 Geo. 2. c. 3 (I))) and also for preventing frauds in the collection thereof. (Repealed by Statute Law Revision (Ireland) Act 1878 (41 & 42 Vict. c. 57))
Oaths of Qualification (Indemnity) Act 1733 (repealed)	7 Geo. 2. c. 4 (I)	29 April 1734
An Act for allowing further time to persons in offices or employments to qualify themselves pursuant to an act, intituled, "An Act to prevent the further growth of popery." (Note: Popery Act 1703 (2 Anne c. 6 (I))) (Repealed by Statute Law Revision (Ireland) Act 1878 (41 & 42 Vict. c. 57))
Solicitors Act 1733	7 Geo. 2. c. 5 (I)	29 April 1734
An Act for the Amendment of the Law in relation to Popish Solicitors; and for remedying other Mischiefs in relation to the Practitioners in several Courts of Law and Equity. (Repealed for the Republic of Ireland by Statute Law Revision (Pre-Union Irish Statutes) Act 1962 (No. 29))
Converted Protestants (Justices of the Peace) Act 1733 (repealed)	7 Geo. 2. c. 6 (I)	29 April 1734
An Act to prevent Persons converted from the Popish to the Protestant Religion, and married to Popish Wives, or educating their Children in the Popish Religion, from acting as Justices of the Peace. (Repealed by Statute Law Revision (Ireland) Act 1878 (41 & 42 Vict. c. 57))
Expiring Statutes Continuance Act 1733 (repealed)	7 Geo. 2. c. 7 (I)	29 April 1734
An Act for continuing several temporary Statutes, and for other Purposes therein mentioned. (Repealed by Statute Law Revision (Ireland) Act 1878 (41 & 42 Vict. c. 57))
Deer Stealers Act 1733 (repealed)	7 Geo. 2. c. 8 (I)	29 April 1734
An Act for the more effectual Discovery and Punishment of Deer Stealers. (Repealed by Criminal Statutes (Ireland) Repeal Act 1828 (9 Geo. 4. c. 53))
Spinners Act 1733^{(Republic of Ireland)}	7 Geo. 2. c. 9 (I)	29 April 1734
An Act to prevent Frauds and Abuses in Bay-yarn exported to Great Britain.
Flaxen and Hempen Manufactures Act 1733	7 Geo. 2. c. 10 (I)	29 April 1734
An Act for the further regulation and improvement of the flaxen and hempen manufactures.
Fishery Encouragement Act 1733	7 Geo. 2. c. 11 (I)	29 April 1734
An Act for the further encouragement of the fishery of this kingdom.
Tillage, Stamp-Master, and Constables Act 1733 (repealed)	7 Geo. 2. c. 12 (I)	29 April 1734
An Act to enable the Commissioners appointed to put in Execution, An Act for the Encouragement of Tillage, and better Employment of the Poor, &c. (Note: Tillage, Bogs, Duties, and Wool Export Act 1729 (3 Geo. 2. c. 3 (I))) made in the Second Year of the Reign of his present Majesty; to encrease the Salary of the Stamp-Master in the said Act mentioned; and for encreasing the Salary of the Treasurer of the County of Cork; and also for the better regulating of High Constables, and for the more easy Recovery of Publick Money in the Hands of the Executors and Administrators. (Repealed by Statute Law Revision (Ireland) Act 1878 (41 & 42 Vict. c. 57))
Burying in Woollen Act 1733 (repealed)	7 Geo. 2. c. 13 (I)	29 April 1734
An Act to encourage the home Consumption of Wool, by burying in Woolen only. (Repealed by Statute Law Revision (Ireland) Act 1878 (41 & 42 Vict. c. 57))
Relief of Mortgages Act 1733 (repealed)	7 Geo. 2. c. 14 (I)	29 April 1734
An Act for the Relief of Mortgagees; and for making the Process in Courts of Equity more effectual against Mortgagors, who abscond and cannot be served therewith, and against Persons, who being served refuse to appear; and also for better regulating the Payment of the Fees of Attornies and Solicitors. (Repealed for the Republic of Ireland by Statute Law Revision (Pre-Union Irish Statutes) Act 1962 (No. 29) and for Northern Ireland by the Statute Law Revision Act 1950 (14 Geo. 6. c. 6))
Corn, Meal, and Bread Regulation Act 1733 (repealed)	7 Geo. 2. c. 15 (I)	29 April 1734
An Act for the buying and selling of all forts of corn and meal and other things in the said act mentioned by weight; and for the more effectual preventing the frauds committed in the buying and selling thereof; and for regulating the price and assize of bread; and for better regulating the markets. (Repealed by Statute Law Revision (Ireland) Act 1878 (41 & 42 Vict. c. 57))
Dublin to Kilcullen Road Act 1733	7 Geo. 2. c. 16 (I)	29 April 1734
An Act for making more effectual an act passed in the third year of the reign of his present Majesty King George the second, intituled, "An Act for repairing the road leading from the city of Dublin (Note: Dublin.) to Killcullen-bridge in the county of Kildare;" (Note: Dublin to Kilcullen Road Act 1729 (3 Geo. 2. c. 18 (I))) and for repairing the road leading from Killcullen-bridge to the town of Killcullen in the said county.
Naas to Maryborough Road Act 1733 (repealed)	7 Geo. 2. c. 17 (I)	29 April 1734
An act for making more effectual an act passed in the fifth year of the reign of his present Majesty King George the second, intituled, "An Act for repairing the road leading from the town of Naas (Note: Naas, County Kildare.) in the county of Kildare to the town of Maryborough (Note: Portlaoise, County Laois.) in the Queen's county." (Note: Naas to Maryborough Road Act 1731 (5 Geo. 2. c. 21 (I))) (Repealed by Statute Law Revision (Ireland) Act 1878 (41 & 42 Vict. c. 57))
Dublin to Dunleer Road Act 1733	7 Geo. 2. c. 18 (I)	29 April 1734
An Act for making more effectual an act passed in the fifth year of the reign of his present Majesty King George the second, intituled, "An Act for repairing the road leading from the city of Dublin to the town of Dunleer (Note: Dunleer, County Louth.) in the county of Lowth." (Note: Dublin to Dunleer Road Act 1731 (5 Geo. 2. c. 15 (I)))
Kinnegad to Athlone Road Act 1733	7 Geo. 2. c. 19 (I)	29 April 1734
An Act for repairing the road leading from the town of Kinnegad (Note: Kinnegad, County Westmeath.) in the county of Westmeath to the town of Athlone (Note: Athlone, County Westmeath.) in the said county.
Cork to Kilworth Mountain Road Act 1733	7 Geo. 2. c. 20 (I)	29 April 1734
An Act for making more effectual an Act passed in the fifth Year of the Reign of his present Majesty King George the Second, intituled, "An Act for repairing the Road leading from the City of Cork (Note: Cork, County Cork.) to the Brook which bounds the Counties of Cork and Tipperary, near the Foot of Kilworth Mountain, and for other Purposes herein mentioned." (Note: Cork to Kilworth Mountain Road Act 1731 (5 Geo. 2. c. 20 (I)))
Dublin to Kinnegad Road Act 1733	7 Geo. 2. c. 21 (I)	29 April 1734
An Act for making more effectual an Act passed in the fifth Year of the Reign of his present Majesty King George the Second, intituled, "An Act for repairing the Road leading from the City of Dublin to the Town of Kennegad (Note: Kinnegad, County Westmeath.) in the County of Westmeath; and for the other purposes therein mentioned." (Note: Dublin to Kinnegad Road Act 1731 (5 Geo. 2. c. 16 (I)))
Dublin to Navan, Nobber, and Kells Road Act 1733	7 Geo. 2. c. 22 (I)	29 April 1734
An Act for making more effectual an Act passed in the third Year of the Reign of his present Majesty King George the Second, intituled, "An Act for repairing the Road leading from the City of Dublin to the Town of Navan (Note: Navan, County Meath.) in the County of Meath;" (Note: Dublin to Navan Road Act 1729 (3 Geo. 2. c. 19 (I))) and for repairing the Roads leading from the said town of Navan to the town of Nobber (Note: Nobber, County Meath.) in the said County; as also for repairing the Road leading from the said town of Navan to the Town of Kells (Note: Kells, County Meath.) in the said County.
Banbridge to Belfast Road Act 1733	7 Geo. 2. c. 23 (I)	29 April 1734
An Act for repairing the Road leading from the Bridge over the Bann-Water, commonly called the Bann-Bridge (Note: Banbridge, County Down.) in the County of Down to the Town of Belfast (Note: Belfast, County Antrim.) in the County of Antrim.
Dundalk to Banbridge Road Act 1733	7 Geo. 2. c. 24 (I)	29 April 1734
An Act for repairing the road leading from the town of Dundalk (Note: Dundalk, County Louth.) in the county of Lowth to a bridge over the river Bann, commonly called Bann-Bridge in the county of Down.
Tubber to Ennis and Limerick Road Act 1733	7 Geo. 2. c. 25 (I)	29 April 1734
An Act for repairing the Road leading from Tubber, (Note: Tubber, County Galway/Tubber, County Clare.) near the Bounds of the Counties of Clare and Galway to the town of Ennis (Note: Ennis, County Clare.) in the said County of Clare, and from thence to the North Liberties of the City of Limerick. (Note: Limerick, County Limerick.)
Burton's Bank Creditors Act 1733	7 Geo. 2. c. 26 (I)	29 April 1734
An Act for the relief of the creditors of the bank lately kept by Samuel Burton and Daniel Falkiner; and of the creditors of the bank lately kept by Benjamin Burton, Samuel Burton, and Daniel Falkiner; and of the creditors of the bank lately kept by Benjamin Burton and Samuel Burton; and of the creditors of the bank lately kept by Benjamin Burton and Francis Harrison.

=== Private acts ===
Short title, or popular name	Citation	Royal assent
Long title
Morris's Creditors Act 1733	7 Geo. 2. c. 1 Pr. (I)	29 April 1734
An Act for the relief of the creditors of Samuel Morris, esquire, deceased, and of Samuel Morris, esquire, his son and heir, by sale of part of the estate of the said Samuel Morris, the son, for payment of debts and legacies, and for other purposes therein mentioned.
Graham's Estate Act 1733	7 Geo. 2. c. 2 Pr. (I)	29 April 1734
An Act for the sale of part of the settled estate of William Graham, of Drogheda, esquire, and for settling other lands in lieu thereof, and for other purposes therein mentioned.

=== Sources ===
- "Acts of Parliament by Session: 1733". Irish Legislation Database. Queen's University Belfast.

== 9 Geo. 2 (1735) ==
The 5th session of the parliament of George II, which met from 7 October 1735 until 30 March 1736.

This session was also traditionally cited as 9 G. 2.

=== Public acts ===
Short title, or popular name	Citation	Royal assent
Long title
Import Duties Act 1735 (repealed)	9 Geo. 2. c. 1 (I)	12 December 1735
An Act for granting and continuing to his Majesty an additional duty on beer, ale, strong waters, wine, tobacco, and other goods and merchandizes therein mentioned. (Repealed by Statute Law Revision (Ireland) Act 1878 (41 & 42 Vict. c. 57))
Import Duties, Pensions Tax, and Loan Act 1735 (repealed)	9 Geo. 2. c. 2 (I)	12 December 1735
An Act for granting to his Majesty a further additional duty on wine, silk, hops, china, earthen, japanned, or lacquered ware, and vinegar; and also a tax of four shillings in the pound on all salaries, profits of employments, fees, and pensions, to be applied to pay an interest of five pounds per cent. per annum for the sum of three hundred thousand pounds, or such part thereof as shall remain unpaid on the twenty fifth day of December one thousand seven hundred and thirty five, and towards the discharge of the said principal sum. (Repealed by Statute Law Revision (Ireland) Act 1878 (41 & 42 Vict. c. 57))
Juries Act 1735 (repealed)	9 Geo. 2. c. 3 (I)	17 March 1736
An Act for the better regulating of Juries. (Repealed by Statute Law Revision (Ireland) Act 1878 (41 & 42 Vict. c. 57))
Flaxen and Hempen Manufactures Act 1735	9 Geo. 2. c. 4 (I)	17 March 1736
An Act for the further encouragement and improvement of the flaxen and hempen manufactures.
Judgments Assignment and Rents Recovery Act 1735 (repealed)	9 Geo. 2. c. 5 (I)	17 March 1736
An Act for the more effectual assigning of judgments, and for the more speedy recovery of rents by distress. (Repealed by Statute Law Revision (Ireland) Act 1878 (41 & 42 Vict. c. 57))
Expiring Statutes Continuance Act 1735	9 Geo. 2. c. 6 (I)	17 March 1736
An Act for continuing and amending several Statutes now near expiring.
Timber Act 1735^{(Republic of Ireland)} or the Land Improvement Act (Ireland) 1735^{(United Kingdom)}	9 Geo. 2. c. 7 (I)	17 March 1736
An Act for encouraging the planting of timber trees.
Tippling Act 1735^{(Republic of Ireland)}	9 Geo. 2. c. 8 (I)	17 March 1736
An Act to prevent the Evil arising by the Retailers of Beer, Ale, Brandy, Rum, Geneva, Aquavitæ, and other Spirituous Liquors, giving Credit to Servants, Day-Labourers, and other Persons, who usually work or ply for Hire or Wages.
Beer and Ale Barrels Gauge Act 1735 (repealed)	9 Geo. 2. c. 9 (I)	17 March 1736
An Act for better ascertaining the Gauge and Measure of Barrels and Half-barrels, used by Brewers in selling Beer, Ale, and Small Beer. (Repealed by Weights and Measures Act 1824 (5 Geo. 4. c. 74) and for the Republic of Ireland by Statute Law Revision (Pre-Union Irish Statutes) Act 1962 (No. 29))
Unsound Drugs and Medicines Act 1735 (repealed)	9 Geo. 2. c. 10 (I)	17 March 1736
An Act for preventing frauds and abuses committed in the making and vending unfound, adulterated, and bad drugs and medicines. (Repealed by Statute Law Revision (Ireland) Act 1878 (41 & 42 Vict. c. 57))
Marriage Act 1735	9 Geo. 2. c. 11 (I)	30 March 1736
An Act for the more effectual preventing clandestine Marriages.
Parish Union and Division Amendment Act 1735 (repealed)	9 Geo. 2. c. 12 (I)	30 March 1736
An Act for explaining an act (Note: Parish Union and Division Act 1715 (2 Geo. 1. c. 14 (I))) for real union and division of parishes. (Repealed by Union of Parishes (Ireland) Act 1827 (7 & 8 Geo. 4. c. 43))
Glebe Act 1735 (repealed)	9 Geo. 2. c. 13 (I)	30 March 1736
An Act for making more effectual an act (Note: Glebe Act 1725 (12 Geo. 1. c. 10 (I))) to amend and explain an act intituled, "An act to encourage building of houses and making other improvements on church lands, and to prevent dilapidations." (Note: Glebe Act 1698 (10 Will. 3. c. 6 (I))) (Repealed by Church of Ireland Acts Repeal Act 1851 (14 & 15 Vict. c. 71))
Mullingar to Lanesborough Road Act 1735	9 Geo. 2. c. 14 (I)	17 March 1736
An Act for repairing the road leading from the town of Mullingar (Note: Mullingar, County Westmeath.) in the county of Westmeath through the towns of Rathcondra (Note: Rathconrath, County Westmeath.) and Mevore (Note: Moyvore, County Westmeath.) in the said county, and through the town of Ballymahon (Note: Ballymahon, County Longford.) in the county of Longford to Lanesborough (Note: Lanesborough, County Longford.) in the said county.
Antrim to Coleraine Road Act 1735	9 Geo. 2. c. 15 (I)	17 March 1736
An Act for repairing the road leading from the town of Antrim (Note: Antrim, County Antrim.) in the county of Antrim through the towns of Ballymenagh (Note: Ballymena, County Antrim.) and Ballymoney (Note: Ballymoney, County Antrim.) in the said county, and to the town of Coleraine (Note: Coleraine, County Londonderry.) in the county of Londonderry.
Quakers Affirmation Act 1735 (repealed)	9 Geo. 2. c. 16 (I)	30 March 1736
An act for accepting the solemn affirmation or declaration of the people called Quakers, instead of an oath in the usual form. (Repealed by Statute Law Revision (Ireland) Act 1878 (41 & 42 Vict. c. 57))
Banbridge to Randalstown Road Act 1735	9 Geo. 2. c. 17 (I)	17 March 1736
An act for repairing the road leading from the bridge commonly called Ban-bridge, (Note: Banbridge, County Down.) over the Ban-water, in the county of Down to Randalstown (Note: Randalstown, County Antrim.) in the county of Antrim.
Armagh to Lisburn Road Act 1735	9 Geo. 2. c. 18 (I)	17 March 1736
An act for repairing the road leading from the town of Armagh (Note: Armagh, County Armagh.) in the county of Armagh to the town of Lisburn (Note: Lisburn, County Antrim.) in the county of Antrim.
Armagh to Newry Road Act 1735	9 Geo. 2. c. 19 (I)	17 March 1736
An act for repairing the road leading from the town of Armagh in the county of Armagh to the town of Newry (Note: Newry, County Down.) in the county of Down.
Insolvent Debtors Relief Act 1735 (repealed)	9 Geo. 2. c. 20 (I)	30 March 1736
An Act for the relief of insolvent debtors. (Repealed by Statute Law Revision (Ireland) Act 1878 (41 & 42 Vict. c. 57))
Mullingar to Longford Road Act 1735	9 Geo. 2. c. 21 (I)	17 March 1736
An Act for repairing the road leading from the town of Mullingar in the county of Westmeath over Ballynelack-bridge (Note: Ballinalack Bridge over the River Inny, Ballinalack, County Westmeath.) in the said county, and through Edgeworthstown (Note: Edgeworthstown, County Longford.) in the county of Longford, to the town of Longford in the said county of Longford; (Note: Longford, County Longford.) and for the other purposes therein mentioned.
Maryborough to Toomevara Road Act 1735	9 Geo. 2. c. 22 (I)	30 March 1736
An Act for repairing the road leading from the town of Maryborough (Note: Portlaoise, County Laois.) in the Queen's county through the towns of Mountrath, (Note: Mountrath, County Laois.) Castletown, (Note: Castletown, County Laois.) and Borris in Ossory, (Note: Borris-in-Ossory, County Laois.) in the same county; and from thence through the town of Roscrea (Note: Roscrea, County Tipperary.) to the town of Tomivarah (Note: Toomevara, County Tipperary.) in the county of Tipperary.
Kilcullen to Timahoe Road Act 1735	9 Geo. 2. c. 23 (I)	30 March 1736
An Act for repairing the road leading from the Green of Kilcullen (Note: Kilcullen, County Kildare.) in the county of Kildare to the town of Athy (Note: Athy, County Kildare.) in the same county, and from thence through the town of Stradbally (Note: Stradbally, County Laois.) to the town of Timoho (Note: Timahoe, County Laois.) in the Queen's county.
Kilcullen to Kilkenny Road Act 1735	9 Geo. 2. c. 24 (I)	17 March 1736
An Act to explain, amend, and make more effectual an act, intituled, "An act for repairing the road leading from the town of Kilcullen in the county of Kildare to the city of Kilkenny." (Note: Kilkenny, County Kilkenny.) (Note: Kilcullen to County Kilkenny Road Act 1731 (5 Geo. 2. c. 18 (I)))
City of Cork Act 1735^{(Republic of Ireland)}	9 Geo. 2. c. 25 (I)	17 March 1736
An Act for rebuilding the cathedral church of St. Finbarry in the city of Cork, and for erecting a work-house in the city of Cork for employing and maintaining the poor, punishing of vagabonds, and providing for and educating foundling children.
Kilkenny to Clonmell Road Act 1735	9 Geo. 2. c. 26 (I)	30 March 1736
An Act for explaining, amending, and making more effectual an act, intituled, "An act for repairing the road leading from the city of Kilkenny to the town of Clonmell (Note: Clonmel, County Tipperary.) in the county of Tipperary." (Note: Kilkenny to Clonmell Road Act 1731 (5 Geo. 2. c. 19 (I)))
Burton's Bank Creditors Act 1735	9 Geo. 2. c. 27 (I)	30 March 1736
An Act for continuing and amending an act (Note: Burton's Bank Creditors Act 1733 (7 Geo. 2. c. 26 (I))) for the relief of the creditors of the bank lately kept by Samuel Burton and Daniel Falkiner; and of the creditors of the bank lately kept by Benjamin Burton, Samuel Burton, Daniel Falkiner; and of the creditors of the bank lately kept by Benjamin Burton and Samuel Burton; and of the creditors of the bank lately kept by Benjamin Burton and Francis Harrison.

=== Private acts ===
Short title, or popular name	Citation	Royal assent
Long title
Ivers' Estate Act 1735	9 Geo. 2. 1 Pr. (I)	17 March 1736
An Act for vesting part of the estate of Henry Ivers, esquire, in trustees, for raising money to discharge the debts and encumbrances affecting the whole, and for enabling the said Henry Ivers, and those in remainder by his father's settlement when in possession to make leases for lives renewable for ever of the town of Mount Ivers, and of the lands about it, at an improved rent.
Nuttall's and Maguire's Creditors Act 1735	9 Geo. 2. 2 Pr. (I)	30 March 1736
An Act for the speedy and more effectual getting in of the effects of Joseph Nuttall and William Maguire, and the distributing of the same among their creditors.
Fleming's Creditors and Lessees Act 1735	9 Geo. 2. 3 Pr. (I)	30 March 1736
An Act for the relief of the Protestant creditors and lessees of Sir John Fleming, knight, deceased, and of Michael Fleming, esquire, only son of the said Sir John Fleming, and for effectually executing certain articles of agreement entered into between the said Michael Fleming and Mary O'Gara, widow.
Leslie's Estate Act 1735	9 Geo. 2. 4 Pr. (I)	30 March 1736
An Act for sale of part of the lands of Emy and Glasslough, the estate of Robert Leslie, esquire, lying in the county of Monaghan, and for applying the money arising thereby, as also the sum of £3000 part of the portion of Frances Leslie, alias Ludlow, wife of the said Robert Leslie, to the payment of debts and encumbrances affecting the said lands, and other the debts of the said Robert Leslie, and for settling the residue and remainder of the said lands of Glasslough and Emy to the several uses herein mentioned.

=== Sources ===
- "Acts of Parliament by Session: 1735". Irish Legislation Database. Queen's University Belfast.
- "Pre-Union Irish Statutes: 1735 Acts". Irish Statute Book. Attorney General of Ireland.

== 11 Geo. 2 (1737) ==
The 6th session of the parliament of George II, which met from 4 October 1737 until 23 March 1738.

This session was also traditionally cited as 11 G. 2.

=== Public acts ===
Short title, or popular name	Citation	Royal assent
Long title
Import Duties Act 1737 (repealed)	11 Geo. 2. c. 1 (I)	19 December 1737
An Act for granting and continuing to his Majesty an additional duty on beer, ale, strong waters, wine, tobacco, and other goods and merchandizes therein mentioned. (Repealed by Statute Law Revision (Ireland) Act 1878 (41 & 42 Vict. c. 57))
Import Duties, Pensions Tax, and Loan Act 1737 (repealed)	11 Geo. 2. c. 2 (I)	19 December 1737
An Act for granting to his Majesty a further additional duty on wine, silk, hops, china, earthen, japanned, or lacquered ware, and vinegar; and also a tax of four shillings in the pound on all salaries, profits of employments, fees, and pensions, to be applied to pay an interest of five pounds per cent. per annum for the sum of three hundred thousand pounds, or such part thereof as shall remain unpaid on the twenty fifth day of December one thousand seven hundred and thirty seven, and towards the discharge of the said principal sum. (Repealed by Statute Law Revision (Ireland) Act 1878 (41 & 42 Vict. c. 57))
Revenue and Unlicensed Goods Act 1737 (repealed)	11 Geo. 2. c. 3 (I)	23 March 1738
An Act for continuing and amending several laws heretofore made relating to his Majesty's revenue, and the more effectual preventing the running of goods. (Repealed by Statute Law Revision (Ireland) Act 1878 (41 & 42 Vict. c. 57))
Hempen and Flaxen Manufactures Act 1737	11 Geo. 2. c. 4 (I)	23 March 1738
An Act for the further encouragement of the hempen and flaxen manufactures.
Privilege of Parliament Act 1737	11 Geo. 2. c. 5 (I)	23 March 1738
An Act to explain and amend an Act, intituled, "An Act for preventing Inconveniencies that may happen by Privilege of Parliament." (Note: Privilege of Parliament Act 1727 (1 Geo. 2. c. 8 (I))) (Repealed for the Republic of Ireland by Statute Law Revision (Pre-Union Irish Statutes) Act 1962 (No. 29))
Administration of Justice (Language) Act (Ireland) 1737^{(United Kingdom)}	11 Geo. 2. c. 6 (I)	23 March 1738
An Act that all Proceedings in Courts of justice within this Kingdom shall be in the English language. (Repealed for the Republic of Ireland by Statute Law Revision (Pre-Union Irish Statutes) Act 1962 (No. 29))
Foreign Service Enlistment Act 1737 (repealed)	11 Geo. 2. c. 7 (I)	23 March 1738
An Act for the more effectual preventing the Enlisting of His Majesty's Subjects to serve as Soldiers in foreign Service without His Majesty's License. (Repealed by Foreign Enlistment Act 1819 (59 Geo. 3. c. 69))
Malicious Maiming and Secret Arms Act 1737 (repealed)	11 Geo. 2. c. 8 (I)	23 March 1738
An Act to prevent malicious maiming and wounding, and to prevent carrying secret arms. (Repealed by Offences Against the Person (Ireland) Act 1829 (10 Geo. 4. c. 34))
Shipwreck and Ship Burning Act 1737	11 Geo. 2. c. 9 (I)	23 March 1738
An Act for enforcing and making perpetual an act, intituled, "An Act for the preserving all such ships, and goods thereof, which shall happen to be forced on shore, or stranded upon the coasts of this kingdom;" (Note: Shipwrecked Goods Preservation Act 1717 (4 Geo. 1. c. 4 (I))) and also for inflicting the punishment of death on such as shall wilfully burn, sink, or destroy ships.
Oaths of Qualification (Indemnity) and Dissenters Act 1737 (repealed)	11 Geo. 2. c. 10 (I)	23 March 1738
An Act for allowing further time to persons in offices to qualify themselves pursuant to an act, intituled, "An act to prevent the further growth of popery;" (Note: Popery Act 1703 (2 Anne c. 6 (I))) and for giving further ease to protestant dissenters with respect to matrimonial contracts. (Repealed by Statute Law Revision (Ireland) Act 1878 (41 & 42 Vict. c. 57))
Corn, Meal, and Bread Regulation Act 1737 (repealed)	11 Geo. 2. c. 11 (I)	23 March 1738
An Act for buying and selling of all sorts of corn and meal, and other things therein mentioned, by weight; and for the more effectual preventing the frauds committed in the buying and selling thereof; and for regulating the price and assize of bread; and for better regulating the markets. (Repealed by Statute Law Revision (Ireland) Act 1878 (41 & 42 Vict. c. 57))
Game Act 1737 (repealed)	11 Geo. 2. c. 12 (I)	23 March 1738
An Act for the better preservation of the game. (Repealed by Statute Law Revision (Ireland) Act 1878 (41 & 42 Vict. c. 57))
Expiring Statutes Continuance Act 1737 (repealed)	11 Geo. 2. c. 13 (I)	23 March 1738
An Act for reviving, continuing, and explaining, and amending several temporary statutes, and for other purposes therein mentioned. (Repealed by Statute Law Revision (Ireland) Act 1878 (41 & 42 Vict. c. 57))
Fishery Encouragement Act 1737 (repealed)	11 Geo. 2. c. 14 (I)	23 March 1738
An Act for the further improvement and encouragement of the fishery of this kingdom. (Repealed by Statute Law Revision (Ireland) Act 1878 (41 & 42 Vict. c. 57))
Church Lands and Episcopal Rents Act 1737	11 Geo. 2. c. 15 (I)	23 March 1738
An Act to repeal Part of an Act passed in the Tenth and Eleventh Years of King Charles the First, intituled, "An Act for the Preservation of the Inheritance, Rights, and Profits of Lands belonging to the Church and Persons Ecclesiastical," (Note: Ecclesiastical Lands Act 1634 (10 & 11 Chas. 1. c. 3 (I))) and also for the more easy Recovery of the Arrears of Rent due to Archbishops and Bishops upon their Translation.
Insolvent Debtors Relief Act 1737 (repealed)	11 Geo. 2. c. 16 (I)	23 March 1738
An Act for the relief of insolvent debtors. (Repealed by Statute Law Revision (Ireland) Act 1878 (41 & 42 Vict. c. 57))
Mullingar to Lanesborough and Roscommon Road Act 1737	11 Geo. 2. c. 17 (I)	23 March 1738
An Act to explain and amend an act, intituled, "An act for repairing the road leading from the town of Mullingar (Note: Mullingar, County Westmeath.) in the county of Westmeath through the towns of Rathcondra (Note: Rathconrath, County Westmeath.) and Mevore (Note: Moyvore, County Westmeath.) in the said county, and through the town of Ballymahon (Note: Ballymahon, County Longford.) in the county of Longford to Lanesborough (Note: Lanesborough, County Longford.) in the said county;" (Note: Mullingar to Lanesborough Road Act 1735 (9 Geo. 2. c. 14 (I))) and for the repairing the road from the said town of Lanesborough to the town of Roscommon (Note: Roscommon, County Rosommon.) in the county of Roscommon; and also for amending one other act of the seventh year of his present Majesty, intituled, "An act for the repairing the road leading from the town of Kinnegad (Note: Kinnegad, County Westmeath.) in the county of Westmeath to the town of Athlone (Note: Athlone, County Westmeath.) in the said county." (Note: Kinnegad to Athlone Road Act 1733 (7 Geo. 2. c. 19 (I)))
Toomevara to Limerick Road Act 1737 (repealed)	11 Geo. 2. c. 18 (I)	23 March 1738
An Act for repairing the high road from the town of Tomivarah (Note: Toomevara, County Tipperary.) in the county of Tipperary to the town of Silver-mines, (Note: Silvermines, County Tipperary.) as also to the town of Nenagh, (Note: Nenagh, County Tipperary.) and from the said towns of Nenagh and Silver-mines by Shally-orchard (Note: Shallee Orchard, County Tipperary.) through the town of Tullo (Note: Newport, County Tipperary.) in the said county to the city of Limerick. (Note: Limerick, County Limerick.) (Repealed by Toomevara to Limerick Road Act 1795 (35 Geo. 3. c. 16 (I))
Dublin Street Lights Amendment Act 1737 (repealed)	11 Geo. 2. c. 19 (I)	23 March 1738
An Act for the further explaining and amending the several acts of Parliament now in force for erecting lamps in the city of Dublin and liberties thereof. (Repealed by Statute Law Revision (Ireland) Act 1878 (41 & 42 Vict. c. 57))

=== Private acts ===
Short title, or popular name	Citation	Royal assent
Long title
Coote's Estate Act 1737	11 Geo. 2. c. 1 Pr. (I)	23 March 1738
An Act to enable Charles Coote, of Cootehill, in the county of Cavan, esquire, to charge his estate settled on his intermarriage, with a further sum of £8000 for the portions and provisions of three or more younger children, whether sons or daughters, or both, so as the same, with the sum of £4000 charged thereon by the said settlement, do not amount to more than £2000 apiece for such younger children, if equally divided, upon the consideration therein mentioned.
Rainey's Charity Act 1737	11 Geo. 2. c. 2 Pr. (I)	23 March 1738
An Act for rendering the charity devised by the will of Hugh Rainey, late of Magherafelt, in the county of Londonderry, gentleman, more effectual, and to enable the devisees under the said will to make fee-farm leases and leases for lives renewable forever.
Reddy's and Reddy's Creditors Act 1737	11 Geo. 2. c. 3 Pr. (I)	23 March 1738
An Act for the relief of the creditors of Daniel Reddy, esquire, and of Dudley Reddy, his brother, deceased, by the sale of their real and personal estates, for payment of their debts.

=== Sources ===
- "Acts of Parliament by Session: 1737". Irish Legislation Database. Queen's University Belfast.

== 13 Geo. 2 (1739) ==
The 7th session of the parliament of George II, which met from 29 October 1739 until 31 March 1740.

This session was also traditionally cited as 13 G. 2.

=== Public acts ===
Short title, or popular name	Citation	Royal assent
Long title
Import Duties Act 1739 (repealed)	13 Geo. 2. c. 1 (I)	19 December 1739
An Act for granting and continuing to his Majesty an additional duty on beer, ale, strong waters, wine, tobacco, and other goods and merchandizes therein mentioned. (Repealed by Statute Law Revision (Ireland) Act 1878 (41 & 42 Vict. c. 57))
Import Duties, Pensions Tax, and Loan Act 1739 (repealed)	13 Geo. 2. c. 2 (I)	19 December 1739
An Act for granting to his Majesty a further additional duty on wine, silk, hops, china, earthen, japanned, or lacquered ware, and vinegar; and also a tax of four shillings in the pound on all salaries, profits of employments, fees, and pensions; to be applied to pay an interest of five pounds per cent. per annum for the sum of three hundred thousand pounds, or such part thereof as shall remain unpaid on the twenty fifth day of December one thousand seven hundred and thirty nine, and towards the discharge of the said principal sum. (Repealed by Statute Law Revision (Ireland) Act 1878 (41 & 42 Vict. c. 57))
Revenue and Customs Frauds Act 1739 (repealed)	13 Geo. 2. c. 3 (I)	31 March 1740
An Act for continuing and amending several laws heretofore made relating to his Majesty's revenue, and the more effectual preventing frauds in his Majesty's customs and excise. (Repealed by Statute Law Revision (Ireland) Act 1878 (41 & 42 Vict. c. 57))
Expiring Statutes Continuance Act 1739 (repealed)	13 Geo. 2. c. 4 (I)	31 March 1740
An Act for continuing several temporary statutes. (Repealed by Statute Law Revision (Ireland) Act 1878 (41 & 42 Vict. c. 57))
Juries Regulation Act 1739 (repealed)	13 Geo. 2. c. 5 (I)	31 March 1740
An Act to continue and amend an Act, made in the ninth year of the reign of His Present Majesty, intituled, "An Act for the better regulating of juries." (Note: Juries Act 1735 (9 Geo. 2. c. 3 (I))) (Repealed by Statute Law Revision (Ireland) Act 1878 (41 & 42 Vict. c. 57))
Disarming Papists Act 1739 (repealed)	13 Geo. 2. c. 6 (I)	31 March 1740
An act to explain, amend, and make more effectual an Act, passed in the seventh Year of the Reign of his late Majesty King William the Third of glorious Memory, intituled, "An Act for the better securing the Government by disarming Papists." (Note: Papists Act 1695 (7 Will. 3. c. 5 (I))) (Repealed by Statute Law Revision (Ireland) Act 1878 (41 & 42 Vict. c. 57))
Oaths of Qualification (Indemnity) Act 1739 (repealed)	13 Geo. 2. c. 7 (I)	31 March 1740
An Act for allowing further time to persons in offices or employments to qualify themselves, pursuant to an Act, intituled, "An Act to prevent the further growth of Popery." (Note: Popery Act 1703 (2 Anne c. 6 (I))) (Repealed by Statute Law Revision (Ireland) Act 1878 (41 & 42 Vict. c. 57))
Gaming Act 1739	13 Geo. 2. c. 8 (I)	31 March 1740
An Act for the more effectual preventing of excessive and deceitful gaming.
Mortgagees Relief, Witnesses, and Christ Church Act 1739 (repealed)	13 Geo. 2. c. 9 (I)	31 March 1740
An Act for explaining and amending, An Act (Note: Relief of Mortgages Act 1733 (7 Geo. 2. c. 14 (I))) for the relief of mortgagees, and for the perpetuating the testimony of witnesses in suits in equity; and for impowering the Dean and Chapter of the Holy-Trinity or Christ-Church Dublin, to grant to His Majesty for any term of years, the rooms over the room commonly called the Exchequer-Chamber, and other rooms therein mentioned; and for amending a misnomer in An Act (Note: Coote's Estate Act 1737 (11 Geo. 2. c. 1 Pr. (I))) to enable Charles Coote, Esq; to raise portions for younger children. (Repealed for the Republic of Ireland by Statute Law Revision (Pre-Union Irish Statutes) Act 1962 (No. 29) and for Northern Ireland by the Statute Law Revision Act 1950 (14 Geo. 6. c. 6))
Parish Watches, Highways, and Public Money Act 1739	13 Geo. 2. c. 10 (I)	31 March 1740
An Act to explain and amend an Act, passed in the sixth year of the reign of His late Majesty, King George the First, intituled, "An Act for the better regulating the Parish-Watches, and amending the high-ways in this Kingdom, and for preventing the misapplication of public money." (Note: Parish Watches, Highways, and Public Money Act 1719 (6 Geo. 1. c. 10 (I)))
Hempen and Flaxen Manufactures Act 1739	13 Geo. 2. c. 11 (I)	31 March 1740
An Act for the further improvement of the hempen and flaxen manufactures of this Kingdom.
Butter, Tallow, Hides, Beef, Pork, and Salmon Act 1739	13 Geo. 2. c. 12 (I)	31 March 1740
An Act for continuing and amending the laws now in force, in relation to butter and tallow, and the casks in which such goods are to be made up, and for the curing of hides, and making up beef and pork for exportation; and for preventing the destruction of salmon. (Repealed for the Republic of Ireland by Statute Law Revision (Pre-Union Irish Statutes) Act 1962 (No. 29))
Belfast to Antrim and Randalstown to Toom Ferry Roads Act 1739	13 Geo. 2. c. 13 (I)	31 March 1740
An Act for amending and repairing the highway or road leading from the town of Belfast (Note: Belfast, County Antrim.) in the county of Antrim through the parish of Carmony to the town of Antrim, (Note: Antrim, County Antrim.) and from the town of Randalstown (Note: Randalstown, County Antrim.) to the ferry of Toom (Note: Toome, County Antrim.) in the said county.
Road from Timahoe to Tipperary Act 1739	13 Geo. 2. c. 14 (I)	31 March 1740
An Act for repairing the road leading from Timohoe (Note: Timahoe, County Laois.) in the Queen's county through Ballynekill, (Note: Ballinakill, County Laois.) Durrow, (Note: Durrow, County Laois.) Beggars-Inn, and from thence through the city of Cashell (Note: Cashel, County Tipperary.) to the town of Tipperary (Note: Tipperary, County Tipperary.) in the county of Tipperary.
Clonmel to Doneraile Road Act 1739	13 Geo. 2. c. 15 (I)	31 March 1740
An Act for amending and repairing the road leading from the town of Clonmell (Note: Clonmel, County Tipperary.) in the county of Tipperary through the towns of Clogheen, (Note: Clogheen, County Cork.) Mitchelstown, (Note: Mitchelstown, County Cork.) and to Doneraile (Note: Doneraile, County Cork.) in the county of Cork.
Nenagh to Curranaboy Bridge Road Act 1739	13 Geo. 2. c. 16 (I)	31 March 1740
An Act for repairing the road leading from the town of Nenagh (Note: Nenagh, County Tipperary.) in the county of Tipperary through the towns of Bir (Note: Birr, County Offaly.) and Ferbane (Note: Ferbane, County Offaly.) in the King's county to Curranaboy-Bridge (Note: Curranaboy Bridge, County Westmeath.) on the turnpike road leading to Athlone (Note: Athlone, County Westmeath.) in the county of Westmeath.

=== Private acts ===
Short title, or popular name	Citation	Royal assent
Long title
Viscount Netterville's Estate Act 1739	13 Geo. 2. c. 1 Pr. (I)	31 March 1740
An Act for vesting part of the estate of the Right Honourable Nicholas, Lord Viscount Netterville in trustees, to be sold for payment of debts, and for settling other lands in lieu thereof.
Rice's Estate Act 1739	13 Geo. 2. c. 2 Pr. (I)	31 March 1740
An Act for settling the several manors, lands, tenements and hereditaments in the counties of Kildare, Tipperary and Kerry, late the estate of Sir Stephen Rice, late of Mountrice, in the county of Kildare, knight, deceased, and of Edward Rice, esquire, deceased, eldest son and heir of the said Sir Stephen Rice, according to the last will and testament of the said Edward Rice, and to the marriage settlement of James Rice, esquire, deceased, second son of the said Sir Stephen Rice, and also for securing unto Mary Rice, spinster, daughter and heir of the said Edward Rice, a portion of £7000 out of the said estate, and for other purposes therein mentioned.
Heaton's Estate Act 1739	13 Geo. 2. c. 3 Pr. (I)	31 March 1740
An Act for establishing and confirming a partition of certain lands, late the estate of Francis Heaton of Ballyskenagh, alias Mount-Heaton, in the King's county, esquire, deceased, and to subject the said partition to an equal proportion of the encumbrances affecting the said lands.
Boyle's Estate Act 1739	13 Geo. 2. c. 4 Pr. (I)	31 March 1740
An Act to enable Bellingham Boyle, esquire, to raise the sum of £3,500 by way of mortgage upon the lands comprised in his grandfather's settlement.

=== Sources ===
- "Acts of Parliament by Session: 1739". Irish Legislation Database. Queen's University Belfast.

== See also ==
- List of acts of the Parliament of Ireland
- List of acts of the Oireachtas
- List of legislation in the United Kingdom
