= Church Rates (Ireland) Act 1826 =

Act of the Parliament of the United Kingdom

- Act of Parliament
- Parliament of the United Kingdom
- Long title: An Act to consolidate and amend the Laws which regulate the Levy and Application of Church Rates and Parish Cesses, and the Election of Churchwardens, and the Maintenance of Parish Clerks, in Ireland.
- Citation: 7 Geo. 4. c. 72
- Territorial extent: United Kingdom

Dates
- Royal assent: 31 May 1826
- Commencement: 1 January 1827 (Note: Section 57.)
Other legislation
Amends	See § Repealed enactments
Repeals/revokes	See § Repealed enactments

Status: Current legislation

Text of statute as originally enacted

The Church Rates (Ireland) Act 1826 (7 Geo. 4. c. 72) is an act of the Parliament of the United Kingdom that consolidated enactments related to church rates in Ireland.

== Provisions ==
=== Repealed enactments ===
Section 1 of the act repealed 9 enactments, listed in that section.

Citation	Short title	Description	Extent of repeal
6 Geo. 1. c. 5 (I)	Toleration Act 1719	An Act made in the Parliament of Ireland in the Sixth Year of the Reign of King George the First, intituled An Act for exempting the Protestant Dissenters of this Kingdom from certain Penalties to which they are now subject.	As relates to or concerns the Office of Churchwarden or Deputy Churchwarden.
12 Geo. 1. c. 9 (I)	Free Schools and Churches Act 1725	An Act made in the Parliament of Ireland in the Twelfth Year of the Reign of the said King George the First, intituled An Act for the more effectual erecting and better regulating of Free Schools, and for rebuilding and repairing of Churches.	As relates to the more speedy and effectual levying such Money as shall be agreed upon, assessed and ordered at Vestries for building and repairing of Churches.
3 Geo. 2. c. 11 (I)	Churches Repair Act 1729	An Act, made in the Parliament of Ireland in the Third Year of the Reign of King George the Second, intituled An Act for better keeping Churches in repair.	As relates to the collecting, applotting and accounting for Parish Cesses made and agreed upon in Vestry for the Repair of Parish Churches, Chapels and other necessary Charges relating to such Churches and Chapels, or to any Appeal by any Churchwarden in respect of the accounting for such Cesses.
21 Geo. 2. c. 8 (I)	Benefices and Cathedrals (Ireland) Act 1747	An Act made in the Parliament of Ireland in the Twenty first year of the Reign of King George the Second, intituled An Act for disappropriating Benefices belonging to Deans, Archdeacons, Dignitaries and other Members of Cathedral Churches, and for appropriating others in their Stead; and alsofor the Removal of the Sites of ruined Cathedral Churches.	As relates to the putting and keeping in repair of any Parochial Church made Cathedral and Parochial under the said recited Act, except only in Cases where any permanent Agreement shall have been made at any Time before the passing of this Act, by and between the Dean and Chapter of such Church, testified under their Common Seals, and by the Protestant Inhabitants of the Parish or Union in which such Church is situate, ascertaining the Proportions in which such Deans and Chapters and Inhabitants shall respectively contribute to the putting in repair such Cathedral and Parochial Churches.
23 Geo. 2. c. 12 (I)	Recovery of Tithes and Parish Clerks Act 1749	An Act made in the Parliament of Ireland, in the Twenty third Year of the Reign of King George the Second, intituled An Act for amending, cotinuing and making more effectual the several Acts now in force in this Kingdom for the more easy Recovery of Tithes and other Ecclesiastical Dues of small Value, and also for the more easy providing a Maintenance for Parish Clerks.	As relates to the Maintenance of Parish Clerks.
33 Geo. 2. c. 11 (I)	Parish Clerks and Churches Act 1759	An Act made in the Parliament of Ireland in the Thirty third Year of King George the Second (for reviving and amending Part of the said last recited Act of the Twenty third Year of the said King's Reign).	As relates to Parish Clerks.
11 & 12 Geo. 3. c. 16 (I)	Parochial Chapels (Ireland) Act 1771	An Act made in the Parliament of Ireland in the Eleventh and Twelfth Years of the Reign of King George the Third, intituled An Act for erecting Parochial Chapels ofEase in Parishes of large Extent, and making such Chapels, and those that are already erected, perpetual Cures; and for making a proper Provision for the Maintenance of perpetual Curates to officiate in the same; and also in like manner for making appropriate Parishes perpetual Cures.	Whereby it is enacted, that Occupiers of Land within every Parish shall, as to every Cess or Tax for the repairing of any Church or Chapel, or for other necessary Charges belonging to such Church or Chapel, beand be construed to be Inhabitants within every such Parish, whether such Parish be a Parish of itself or be united to any other Parish by Episcopal Union or otherwise, or whether such Occupiers do or do not reside or dwell within such Parish.
21 & 22 Geo. 3. c. 52 (I)	Ecclesiastical Affairs Act 1781	An Act made in the Parliament of Ireland in the Twenty first and Twenty second Years of the Reign of King George the Third, intituled An Act to oblige Churchwardens to account pursuant to an Act for the better keeping Churches in repair; and to make the Cathedral Church of Ferns the Parish Church of the Parish of Ferns.	As relates to obliging of Churchwardens to account.
23 & 24 Geo. 3. c. 49 (I)	Endowments of Parishes, Glebe Lands, etc. Act 1783	An Act made in the Parliament of Ireland in the Twenty third and Twenty fourth Years of the Reign of King George the Third, intituled An Act for making appropriate Parishes belonging to Archbishops and Bishops perpetual Cures, and the better to enable such Archbishops and Bishops to endow and augment the Endowments of Vicarages and Curacies to them respectively appropriate; and to render more effectual the several Acts now in force, to enable the Clergy, having Cure ofSouls, to reside upon their respective Benefices, and to build on their respective Glebe Lands.	Whereby it is enacted, that every Person who shall be duly elected or nominated a Churchwarden of any Parish, Union or Chapelry.
