= Civil parishes of Ireland =

Administrative division of Ireland

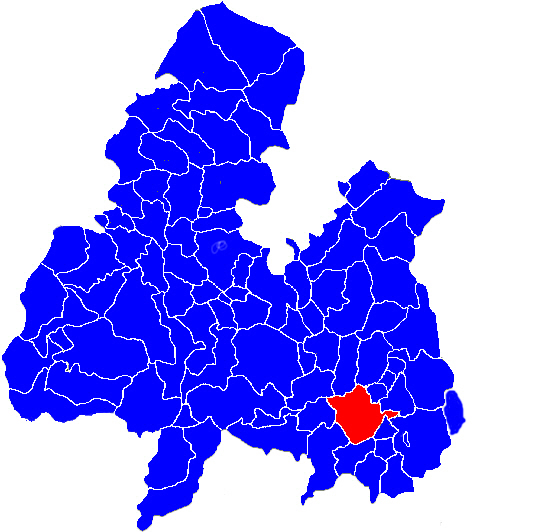
The civil parish of Thurles, shown within Tipperary North.

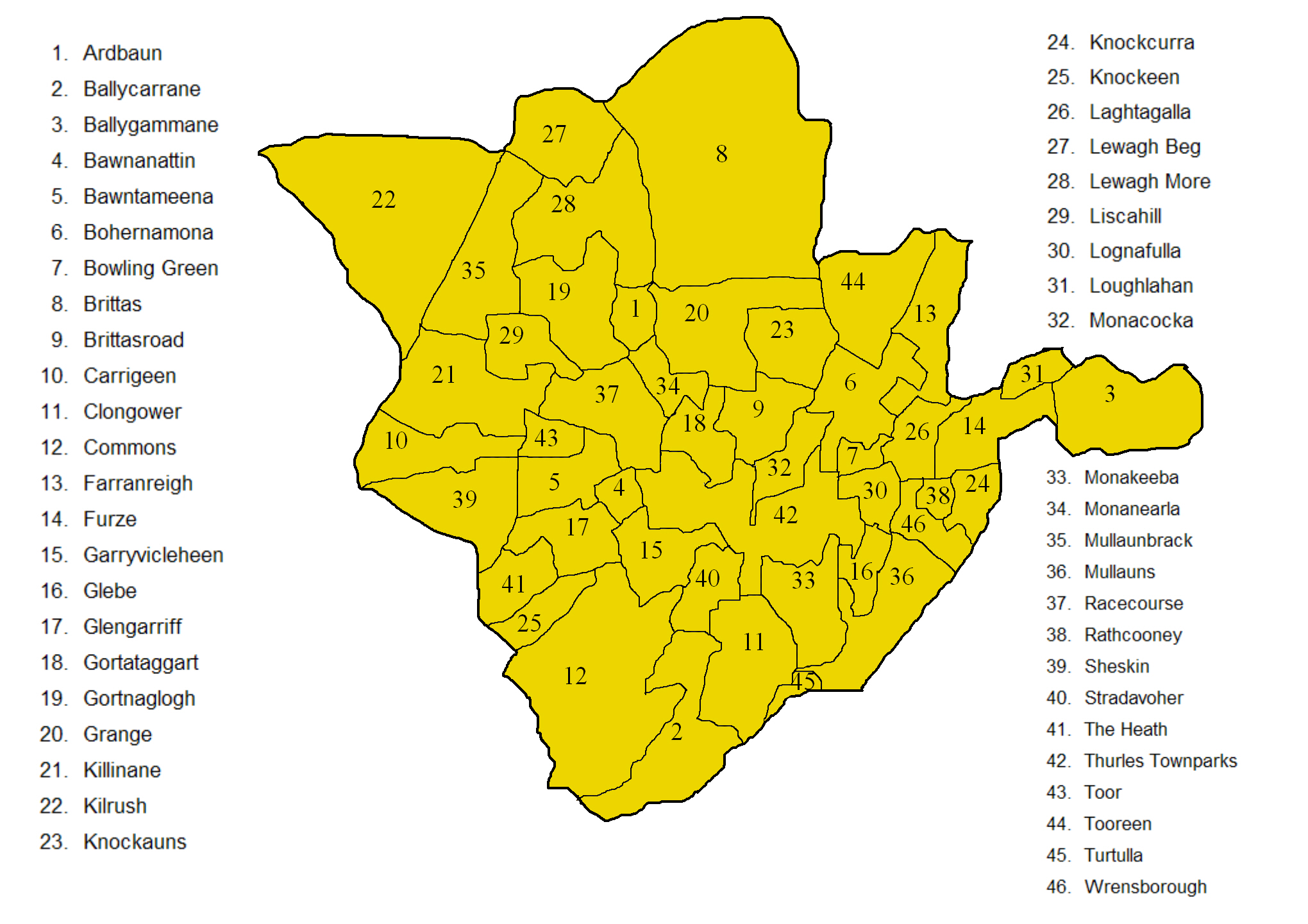
The civil parish of Thurles, shown divided into its townlands.

Civil parishes (Irish: paróistí sibhialta, paróistí dlí) are units of territory in the island of Ireland that have their origins in old Gaelic territorial divisions. They were adopted by the Anglo-Norman Lordship of Ireland and then by the Elizabethan Kingdom of Ireland, and were formalised as land divisions at the time of the Plantations of Ireland. They may correspond, in both name and boundary, with Church of Ireland and Roman Catholic parishes. Their use as administrative units was gradually replaced by Poor Law Divisions in the 19th century, although they were not formally abolished. Today they are still sometimes used for legal purposes, such as to locate property in deeds of property registered between 1833 and 1946.

== Origins ==
The Irish parish was based on the Gaelic territorial unit called a túath or Trícha cét. Following the Norman invasion of Ireland, the Anglo-Norman barons retained the tuath, later renamed a parish or manor, as a unit of taxation. The civil parish was formally created by Elizabethan legislation. Accounts were kept of income and expenditures for each parish including pensions and poor relief. Statutes were based on ecclesiastical parishes, although it is not known how well-defined such parishes were.

At the time of the English Civil War, in 1654–56 a Civil Survey was taken of all the lands of Ireland. It proved inaccurate, and in 1656–58 the Down Survey was conducted, using physical measurements to make as accurate a map as was possible at the time of townlands, parishes and baronies. This became the basis for all future land claims. Parishes are an intermediate subdivision, with multiple townlands per parish and multiple parishes per barony. A civil parish is typically made up of 25–30 townlands. It may include urban areas such as villages. A parish may cross the boundaries of both baronies and counties; in some cases it may be in several geographically separate parts.

Civil parishes had some use in local taxation. They were included on the nineteenth-century maps of the Ordnance Survey of Ireland. The Local Government (Ireland) Act 1898 established administrative counties divided into county districts (urban districts and rural districts) making parishes largely obsolete, and they were removed from subsequent editions of OS maps.

For poor law purposes district electoral divisions replaced the civil parishes in the mid-nineteenth century. Townlands are the smallest land unit in Ireland, and were the most precise address that most rural people had until the 2015 introduction of postcodes.

== Relationship to ecclesiastical parishes ==
An 1871 report to parliament noted that there were three classes of parish in Ireland: the civil parish, the Church of Ireland parish and the Roman Catholic parish. The first two generally but not always had the same boundaries, while the third generally did not. As a result of the 16th-century Protestant Reformation, the Roman Catholic church had to adapt to a structure based on towns and villages, with parishes that generally were larger than the old parishes.

A Tudor statute, renewed in 1695 by the Irish parliament, said that land should be granted in each parish for a resident Protestant schoolmaster. The Union of Parishes (Ireland) Act 1827 (7 & 8 Geo. 4. c. 43) defined rules for redefining parish boundaries, erecting Chapels of Ease and making Perpetual Cures. It has since been amended and in part repealed. While the boundaries of the parishes of the Church of Ireland changed following the Irish Church Act 1869 (32 & 33 Vict. c. 42) of the church in 1869, this did not affect the boundaries of the civil parishes.

The 1871 report noted that ecclesiastical parish boundaries must be flexible to meet the requirements of the cure of souls, but that for statistical and possibly administrative purposes the boundaries of civil parishes should be fixed, or at least should rarely change.

== Administrative uses ==
By 1800 civil parishes had replaced the ecclesiastical parishes for administrative purposes, although the timing and method of the change is not well-documented. The civil parish was used for census and taxation purposes. The civil parishes were included on the nineteenth-century maps of the Ordnance Survey of Ireland.

At the time of the 1861 census there were 2,428 civil parishes in Ireland (average area 34.8 square kilometres (13.4 sq mi; 8,600 acres)). Poor Law districts were created in 1838, each centered on a large town.

There were 130 poor law unions with 829 registration districts and 3,751 district electoral divisions for census purposes. In 1898 poor law unions replaced civil parishes as the basic local government unit.

Later "parish councils" which gained a modicum of official recognition were based on Roman Catholic parishes: first those recognised by the Congested Districts Board for Ireland; and later those recognised by Part VIII of the Local Government Act 1941, mainly set up by Muintir na Tíre and operating during the Second World War Emergency.

== Recent years ==
Civil parishes have not been formally abolished in either Northern Ireland or the Republic of Ireland, and are still used in some legal contexts. One example, where the parish is still referenced in Republic of Ireland law, is the Intoxicating Liquor Act, 1988, which allows "any person resident in the parish in which the club premises are situated" to object to the granting of an alcohol licence to a club. Until 1981, the Republic of Ireland's official census reports included the populations of civil parishes in and near cities, because "numerous requests" were still being made for them. In 2001, there were 2,508 civil parishes. Old records of marriages and births are mostly organised by civil parish. Church of Ireland parishes usually conform to civil parish boundaries.

== See also ==
- List of civil parishes of Ireland
- Baronies of Ireland
- Townland
- Civil parish (England)
