= Union of Parishes (Ireland) Act 1827 =

Act of the Parliament of the United Kingdom

- Act of Parliament
- Parliament of the United Kingdom
- Long title: An Act to consolidate and amend the Laws in force in Ireland for Unions and Divisions of Parishes, and for uniting or disappropriating Appropriate Parishes or Parts of Parishes; and to make further Provision with respect to the erecting Chapels of Ease, and making Perpetual Cures.
- Citation: 7 & 8 Geo. 4. c. 43
- Territorial extent: United Kingdom

Dates
- Royal assent: 23 June 1827
- Commencement: 23 June 1827 (Note: Section 1.)
Other legislation
Amends	See § Repealed enactments
Repeals/revokes	See § Repealed enactments
Amended by	Union of Parishes, etc. (Ireland) Act 1832; Church of Ireland Acts Repeal Act 1851

Status: Amended

Text of statute as originally enacted

The Union of Parishes (Ireland) Act 1827 (7 & 8 Geo. 4. c. 43) is an act of the Parliament of the United Kingdom.

== Provisions ==
=== Repealed enactments ===
Section 1 of the act repealed 9 enactments, listed in that section.

Citation	Short title	Description	Extent of repeal
2 Geo. 1. c. 14 (I)	Parish Union and Division Act 1715	An Act passed in the Second Year of the Reign of King George the First, intituled An Act for real Union and Division of Parishes.	As relates to the real Union and Division of Parishes.
8 Geo. 1. c. 12 (I)	Clergy Residence and Protestant Schools Act 1721	An Act passed in the Eighth Year of the Reign of the said King, intituled An Act for the better enabling the Clergy having Cure of Souls to reside upon their respective Benefices, and for the Encouragement of Protestant Schools within this Kingdom of Ireland.	As relates to the endowing of Churches with Glebes in the Case of Unions of Parishes.
10 Geo. 1. c. 7 (I)	First Fruits Amendment Act 1723	An Act passed in the Tenth Year of the Reign of the said King, intituled An Act for confirming the several Grants made by Her late Majesty of the First Fruits and Twentieth Parts payable out of Ecclesiastical Benefices in this Kingdom, and also for giving the Archbishops and otherEcclesiastical Persons Four Years Timefor the Payment of First Fruits, andf or incorporating the Trustees and Commissioners of the said First Fruits.	As relates to the Payment of First Fruits by divided Parishes.
7 Geo. 2. c. 7 (I)	Expiring Statutes Continuance Act 1733	An Act passed in the Seventh Year of the Reign of King George the Second, intituled An Act for continuing several temporary Statutes, and for other Purposes therein mentioned.	As relates to the separating or uniting Glebes belonging to Parishes.
9 Geo. 2. c. 12 (I)	Parish Union and Division Amendment Act 1735	An Act passed in the Ninth Year of the Reign of the said King George the Second, for explaining and amending the said first recited Act of the Second Year of King George the First.	The whole act.
7 Geo. 3. c. 9 (I)	Union and Division of Parishes Act 1767	An Act passed in the Seventh Year of the Reign of His late Majesty King George the Third, for explaining and amending the said first recited Act of the Second Year of King George the First, and for other Purposes.	As relates to the Payment of Money for Buildings or Improvements made in Glebes in the Case of real Union and Division of Parishes.
11 & 12 Geo. 3. c. 16 (I)	Parochial Chapels (Ireland) Act 1771	An Act passed in the Eleventh and Twelfth Years of the Reign of His said late Majesty, intituled An Actfor erecting Parochial Chapels of Ease in Parishes oflarge Extent, and making such Chapels, and those that are already erected, Perpetual Cures, and for making a proper Provision for the Maintenance of Perpetual Curates to officiate in the same; and also in like Manner for making Appropriate Parishes Perpetual Cures.	As relates to the uniting or disappropriating Appropriate Parishes.
13 & 14 Geo. 3. c. 27 (I)	Armagh Chapels Act 1773	An Act passed in the Thirteenth and Fourteenth Years of His said late Majesty, intituled An Act to amend an Act passed in the Eighth Year of His present Majesty intituled, An Act for erecting Two Chapels of Ease in the Parish of Armagh, and making such Chapels, and those that are already in said Parish, Perpetual Cures, and for making a proper Provision for the Maintenance of Perpetual Curates to officiate in the same, and for other Purposes.	As relates to the uniting or disappropriating Appropriate Parishes.
23 & 24 Geo. 3. c. 49 (I)	Endowments of Parishes, Glebe Lands, etc. Act 1783	An Act passed in the Twenty third and Twenty fourth Years of King George the Third, intituled An Actfor making Appropriate Parishes elonging to Archbishops and Bishops Perpetual Cures, and the better to enable such Archbishops and Bishops to endow and augment the Endowment of Vicarages and Curacies to them respectively appertaining; and to render more effectuat the several Acts now in force to enable the Clergy having Cure of Souls to reside on their respective Benefices, and to build on their respective Glebe Lands.	As relates to the uniting or disappropriating of Appropriate Parishes.
