= Toleration Act 1719 =

Act of the Parliament of Ireland

Toleration Act 1719; Prohibition of Disturbance of Worship Act 1719 (Note: Short title given by the Statute Law Revision Act 2007 (No. 28))
- Act of Parliament
- Parliament of Ireland
- Long title: An Act for exempting the protestant dissenters of this kingdom from certain penalties, to which they are now subject.
- Citation: 6 Geo. 1. c. 5 (I)
- Territorial extent: Ireland

Dates
- Royal assent: 2 November 1719
- Commencement: 12 November 1715 (Note: Start of session.)
Other legislation
Amends	Act of Uniformity 1560
Amended by	Dissenters (Ireland) Act 1817; Church Rates (Ireland) Act 1826; Juries (Ireland) Act 1833; Promissory Oaths Act 1871; Statute Law Revision (Ireland) Act 1878; Statute Law Revision Act 1950

Status: Amended

Text of statute as originally enacted

The Toleration Act 1719 (6 Geo. 1. c. 5 (I)) was an act of the Parliament of Ireland exempting Protestant dissenters from certain restrictions. That meant that Presbyterians had practical freedom of religion.

== Subsequent developments ==
The whole act, except sections 4–8 and 14–16, was repealed by section 1 of, and part II of schedule three to, the Promissory Oaths Act 1871 (34 & 35 Vict. c. 48), which came into force on 13 July 1871.

Section 8 of the act was repealed by section 1(1) of, and the first schedule to, the Statute Law Revision Act 1950 (14 Geo. 6. c. 6), which came into force on 23 May 1950.
