= List of acts of the Parliament of Ireland, 1721–1730 =

This is a list of acts of the Parliament of Ireland for the years from 1721 to 1730.

The number shown by each act's title is its chapter number. Acts are cited using this number, preceded by the years of the reign during which the relevant parliamentary session was held; thus the act concerning assay passed in 1783 is cited as "23 & 24 Geo. 3. c. 23", meaning the 23rd act passed during the session that started in the 23rd year of the reign of George III and which finished in the 24th year of that reign. Note that the modern convention is to use Arabic numerals in citations (thus "40 Geo. 3" rather than "40 Geo. III"). Acts of the reign of Elizabeth I are formally cited without a regnal numeral in the Republic of Ireland.

Acts passed by the Parliament of Ireland did not have a short title; however, some of these acts have subsequently been given a short title by acts of the Parliament of the United Kingdom, acts of the Parliament of Northern Ireland, or acts of the Oireachtas. This means that some acts have different short titles in the Republic of Ireland and Northern Ireland respectively. Official short titles are indicated by the flags of the respective jurisdictions.

A number of the acts included in this list are still in force in Northern Ireland or the Republic of Ireland. Because these two jurisdictions are entirely separate, the version of an act in force in one may differ from the version in force in the other; similarly, an act may have been repealed in one but not in the other.

A number of acts passed by the Parliament of England or the Parliament of Great Britain also extended to Ireland during this period.

== 8 Geo. 1 (1721) ==
The 4th session of the parliament of George I, which met from 12 September 1721 until 18 January 1722.

This session was also traditionally cited as 8 G. 1.

There were no private acts passed in this session.

=== Public acts ===
Short title, or popular name	Citation	Royal assent
Long title
Import Duties, Pensions Tax, and Loan Act 1721 (repealed)	8 Geo. 1. c. 1 (I)	21 December 1721
An Act for granting and continuing to his Majesty the additional duties on beer, ale, strong waters, tobacco, and other goods and merchandizes; and also upon all sorts of wine, strong waters, and spirits perfectly made, and up on all spirits made and distilled of wine; and also for granting and continuing the further additional duties on beer, ale, aqua vitæ, and strong waters, brewed and made in this kingdom; and upon brandy or spirits above proof; and on tea, coffee, chocolate, and cocoa-nuts; and also a tax on all sallaries, profits of employments, fees and pensions therein mentioned; and for securing the repayment of fifty thousand pounds sterling, formerly advanced to his Majesty for the use of the publick, together with the interest thereof. (Repealed by Statute Law Revision (Ireland) Act 1878 (41 & 42 Vict. c. 57))
Distress for Rent Act 1721^{(Republic of Ireland)}	8 Geo. 1. c. 2 (I)	21 December 1721
An Act for amending an act, (Note: Distress for Rent Act 1717 (4 Geo. 1. c. 5 (I))) intituled, "An act to explain and amend an Act, (Note: Distress for Rent Act 1712 (11 Anne c. 2 (I))) intituled, 'An act for the more effectual preventing frauds committed by tenants.'"
Quarantine Act (Ireland) 1721 (repealed)	8 Geo. 1. c. 3 (I)	18 January 1722
An Act to oblige ships coming from infected places more effectually to perform their quarantine; and for the better preventing the plague being brought from foreign parts into this kingdom. (Repealed by Statute Law Revision (Ireland) Act 1878 (41 & 42 Vict. c. 57))
Quieting Possessions and Preventing Vexatious Suits Act 1721	8 Geo. 1. c. 4 (I)	18 January 1722
An Act for the more effectual quieting and securing Possessions, and preventing vexatious Suits at Law.
Boundaries Act 1721^{(Republic of Ireland)}	8 Geo. 1. c. 5 (I)	18 January 1722
An Act to oblige proprietors and tenants of neighbouring lands to make fences between their several lands and holdings.
Law Amendment and Expiring Acts Act 1721 (repealed)	8 Geo. 1. c. 6 (I)	18 January 1722
An Act for the further amendment of the law, and for continuing and amending several acts near expiring. (Repealed for the Republic of Ireland by Statute Law Revision (Pre-Union Irish Statutes) Act 1962 (No. 29) and for Northern Ireland by the Statute Law Revision Act 1950 (14 Geo. 6. c. 6))
Butter, Tallow, Hides, and Salmon Act 1721 (repealed)	8 Geo. 1. c. 7 (I)	18 January 1722
An Act for the further Amendment of the Laws in Relation to Butter and Tallow Casks, Hides, and other Commodities of this Kingdom, and for preventing the Destruction of Salmon. (Repealed by Statute Law Revision (Ireland) Act 1878 (41 & 42 Vict. c. 57))
Woods Act 1721	8 Geo. 1. c. 8 (I)	18 January 1722
An Act for repealing part of an act passed in the tenth year of King William the third, intituled, "An Act for planting and preserving timber-trees and woods;" (Note: Timber Act 1698 (10 Will. 3. c. 12 (I))) and also for giving further encouragement to plant and preserve timber trees and woods.
Felons, Tories, and Foreign Service Act 1721 (repealed)	8 Geo. 1. c. 9 (I)	18 January 1722
An Act for amending an Act, intituled, "An Act for the better and more effectual apprehending and transporting Felons and others; and for continuing and amending several Laws made in this Kingdom for suppressing Tories, Robbers, and Rapperies;" (Note: Felons Apprehension and Transportation Act 1719 (6 Geo. 1. c. 12 (I))) and also to prevent the lifting of His Majesty's Subjects to serve as Soldiers in foreign Service without his Majesty's Licence. (Repealed by Statute Law Revision (Ireland) Act 1878 (41 & 42 Vict. c. 57))
Parish Watches, Highways, and Public Money Act 1721 (repealed)	8 Geo. 1. c. 10 (I)	18 January 1722
An Act for continuing and amending an act, intituled, "An Act for the better regulating the parish-watches, and amending the high ways in this kingdom; and for preventing the misapplication of publick money." (Note: Parish Watches, Highways, and Public Money Act 1719 (6 Geo. 1. c. 10 (I))) (Repealed by Statute Law Revision (Ireland) Act 1878 (41 & 42 Vict. c. 57))
Glebe Exchange Act 1721	8 Geo. 1. c. 11 (I)	18 January 1722
An Act for the supplying a Defect in an Act passed in the Second Year of the Reign of Her late Majesty Queen Anne, intituled, "An Act for the Exchange of Glebes belonging to Churches in this Kingdom." (Note: Glebe Exchange Act 1704 (2 Anne c. 10 (I)))
Clergy Residence and Protestant Schools Act 1721	8 Geo. 1. c. 12 (I)	18 January 1722
An Act for the better enabling of the Clergy having Cure of Souls to reside upon their respective Benefices; and for the Encouragement of Protestant Schools within this kingdom of Ireland.
Pawnbrokers Act 1721^{(Republic of Ireland)} (repealed)	8 Geo. 1. c. 13 (I)	18 January 1722
An Act for reducing the interest of money to seven per cent. (Repealed by Usury Laws Repeal Act 1854 (17 & 18 Vict. c. 90))
Bank Notes Act 1721	8 Geo. 1. c. 14 (I)	18 January 1722
An Act for the better securing the payment of bankers notes.
Registration of Deeds Act 1721^{(Republic of Ireland)}	8 Geo. 1. c. 15 (I)	18 January 1722
An Act for explaining and amending two several Acts (Note: Registration of Deeds Act 1707 (6 Anne c. 2 (I))) (Note: Registration of Deeds Act 1709 (8 Anne c. 10 (I))) in Relation to the Publick Registering of all Deeds Conveyances, and Wills.
Dublin, Cork, and Limerick Street Lights Amendment Act 1721 (repealed)	8 Geo. 1. c. 16 (I)	18 January 1722
An Act for amending an act, intituled, "An Act for erecting and continuing lights in the city of Dublin, and the several liberties adjoining; and also in the cities of Cork and Limerick, and liberties thereof." (Note: Dublin, Cork, and Limerick Street Lights Act 1719 (6 Geo. 1. c. 18 (I))) (Repealed by Statute Law Revision (Ireland) Act 1878 (41 & 42 Vict. c. 57))

=== Sources ===
- "Acts of Parliament by Session: 1721". Irish Legislation Database. Queen's University Belfast.
- "Pre-Union Irish Statutes: 1721 Acts". Irish Statute Book. Attorney General of Ireland.

== 10 Geo. 1 (1723) ==
The 5th session of the parliament of George I, which met from 29 August 1723 until 10 February 1724.

This session was also traditionally cited as 10 G. 1.

=== Public acts ===
Short title, or popular name	Citation	Royal assent
Long title
Import Duties, Pensions Tax, and Loan Act 1723 (repealed)	10 Geo. 1. c. 1 (I)	24 December 1723
An Act for granting and continuing to his Majesty the additional duties on beer, ale, strong waters, tobacco, and other goods and merchandizes; and also upon all sorts of wines, strong waters, and spirits perfectly made, and upon all spirits made and distilled of wine; and also for granting and continuing the further additional duties on beer, ale, aqua vitæ, and strong waters, brewed, and made in this kingdom; and upon brandy or spirits above proof; and on tea, coffee, chocolate, and cocoa-nuts; and also a tax on all salaries, profits of employments, fees, and pensions therein mentioned; and for securing the repayment of fifty thousand pounds sterling formerly advanced to his Majesty for the use of the publick, together with the interest thereof. (Repealed by Statute Law Revision (Ireland) Act 1878 (41 & 42 Vict. c. 57))
Hempen and Flaxen Manufactures Act 1723	10 Geo. 1. c. 2 (I)	10 February 1724
An Act for amending the several laws now in force for encouraging the hempen and flaxen manufactures in this kingdom, and for the further improvement thereof.
Parish Watches, Highways, and Dublin Watch Act 1723 (repealed)	10 Geo. 1. c. 3 (I)	10 February 1724
An Act for continuing and amending an Act, intituled, "An Act for the better regulating the Parish Watches, and amending the High Ways in this Kingdom; and for the preventing the Misapplication of Publick Money;" (Note: Parish Watches, Highways, and Public Money Act 1719 (6 Geo. 1. c. 10 (I))) and also for establishing a regular Watch in the City of Dublin; and to prevent Mischiefs which may happen by Graving Ships in the River Lissey. (Repealed by Statute Law Revision (Ireland) Act 1878 (41 & 42 Vict. c. 57))
Expiring Statutes Continuance Act 1723 (repealed)	10 Geo. 1. c. 4 (I)	10 February 1724
An Act for continuing several temporary statutes made in this kingdom, and now near expiring. (Repealed by Statute Law Revision (Ireland) Act 1878 (41 & 42 Vict. c. 57))
Mining Leases Act 1723^{(Republic of Ireland)}	10 Geo. 1. c. 5 (I)	10 February 1724
An Act for the further Encouragement of finding and working Mines and Minerals within this Kingdom.
Parish Union and Division Amendment Act 1723 (repealed)	10 Geo. 1. c. 6 (I)	10 February 1724
An Act for explaining and amending an Act, intituled, "An Act for real Union and Division of Parishes;" (Note: Parish Union and Division Act 1715 (2 Geo. 1. c. 14 (I))) and for confirming an Exchange made of a Piece of Ground, whereon the Parish-church and Vicarage-house of the Parish of Saint Anne in the Suburbs of the City of Dublin was by a former Act of Parliament (Note: St Anne's Parish Act 1707 (6 Anne c. 21 (I))) directed to be built, for another Piece of Ground; and for appropriating such other Piece of Ground to the same Uses. (Repealed by Statute Law Revision (Ireland) Act 1878 (41 & 42 Vict. c. 57))
First Fruits Amendment Act 1723 (repealed)	10 Geo. 1. c. 7 (I)	10 February 1724
An Act for amending an Act, intituled, "An Act for confirming the several Grants made by her late Majesty of the first Fruits and twentieth Parts; and also for giving the Archbishops and other Ecclesiastical Persons four Years Time for the Payment of First Fruits; and for incorporating the Trustees and Commissioners of the said First Fruits." (Note: First Fruits Act 1715 (2 Geo. 1. c. 15 (I))) (Repealed by Church Temporalities (Ireland) Act 1833 (3 & 4 Will. 4. c. 37))
Quakers Affirmation Act 1723 (repealed)	10 Geo. 1. c. 8 (I)	10 February 1724
An Act for accepting the solemn affirmation or declaration of the people called Quakers, in certain cases, instead of an oath in the usual form. (Repealed by Statute Law Revision (Ireland) Act 1878 (41 & 42 Vict. c. 57))
Butter, Tallow, Hides, Beef, Pork, and Salmon Act 1723 (repealed)	10 Geo. 1. c. 9 (I)	10 February 1724
An Act for continuing and amending the Laws in Relation to Butter and Tallow, and the Casks in which such Goods are to be made up, and in Relation to the curing of Hides, and making up of Beef and Pork for Exportation; and for preventing the Destruction of Salmon. (Repealed by Statute Law Revision (Ireland) Act 1878 (41 & 42 Vict. c. 57))
Sale of Livestock Act 1723^{(Republic of Ireland)}	10 Geo. 1. c. 10 (I)	10 February 1724
An Act for regulating abuses committed in buying and selling of cattle and sheep in the several markets in this kingdom.
Relief of Insolvent Debtors Act 1723 (repealed)	10 Geo. 1. c. 11 (I)	10 February 1724
An Act for the relief of insolvent debtors. (Repealed by Statute Law Revision (Ireland) Act 1878 (41 & 42 Vict. c. 57))

=== Private acts ===
Short title, or popular name	Citation	Royal assent
Long title
Smith's Charity Act 1723	10 Geo. 1. c. 1 Pr. (I)	10 February 1724
An Act for further application of the rents and profits of lands and tenements, formerly given by Erasmus Smith, esquire, deceased, to charitable uses.
Mathew's Estate Act 1723	10 Geo. 1. c. 2 Pr. (I)	10 February 1724
An Act for enabling George Mathew, junior, son and heir apparent of George Mathew, of Thomastown, in the county of Tipperary, esquire, to settle a jointure, and make provision for younger children, and other purposes.
Percy's Estate Act 1723	10 Geo. 1. c. 3 Pr. (I)	10 February 1724
An Act to enable Henry Percy, esquire, and Emerson Percy, his son and heir apparent, to make a settlement on any wife said Emerson may marry, and to make provision for younger children.
Longfield Estate Leases Act 1723	10 Geo. 1. c. 4 Pr. (I)	10 February 1724
An Act to enable William Longfield, of Kilbride, in the county of Meath, esquire and Robert Longfield, of Castlemary, in the county of Cork, esquire to make fee farms, or leases for lives renewable for ever, of the lands and tenements herein after mentioned, by and with consent of Edward Eustace, of Castlemore, in the county of Carlow, esquire.
Blaney's Estate Act 1723	10 Geo. 1. c. 5 Pr. (I)	10 February 1724
An Act to enable the Right Honourable Cadwallader, Lord Baron Blaney, of Monaghan, to sell part of his estate for payment of debts.
Manor of Dunbrody Act 1723	10 Geo. 1. c. 6 Pr. (I)	10 February 1724
An Act for the better settling of the manor of Dunbrody, in the county of Wexford, on the honourable John Chichester, esquire, for life, with power to settle a jointure on any wife he shall marry, and for raising portions for younger children.
O'Hara's Estate Act 1723	10 Geo. 1. c. 7 Pr. (I)	10 February 1724
An Act for sale of part of the estate of Henry O'Hara of Crebilly, in Co. Antrim, esquire, for payment of debts and legacies.
Bell's Estate Act 1723	10 Geo. 1. c. 8 Pr. (I)	10 February 1724
An Act for vesting part of the estate of Robert Bell, of Parane in the County of Mayo, esquire in trustees, to be sold for payment of debts affecting the same.
Cooke's Estate Act 1723	10 Geo. 1. c. 9 Pr. (I)	10 February 1724
An Act for the sale of part of the estate of John Cooke, late of Kiltinane, in the county of Tipperary, esquire, deceased, for payment of debts, legacies, and portions.
Stevenson's Estate Act 1723	10 Geo. 1. c. 10 Pr. (I)	10 February 1724
An Act for the better sale of part of the estate of James Stevenson, esquire, for payment of debts.
Blessinton's Estate Act 1723	10 Geo. 1. c. 11 Pr. (I)	10 February 1724
An Act for making a provision, by way of jointure, for the Right Honourable Martha, Lady Viscountess Blessinton, in case she shall survive her husband Charles, Lord Viscount Blessinton.

=== Sources ===
- "Acts of Parliament by Session: 1723". Irish Legislation Database. Queen's University Belfast.
- "Pre-Union Irish Statutes: 1723 Acts". Irish Statute Book. Attorney General of Ireland.

== 12 Geo. 1 (1725) ==
The 6th session of the parliament of George I, which met from 7 September 1725 until 8 March 1726.

This session was also traditionally cited as 12 G. 1.

=== Public acts ===
Short title, or popular name	Citation	Royal assent
Long title
Import Duties, Pensions Tax, and Loan Act 1725 (repealed)	12 Geo. 1. c. 1 (I)	18 December 1725
An Act for granting and continuing to his Majesty the additional duties on beer, ale, strong waters, tobacco, and other goods and merchandizes; and also upon all sorts of wine, strong waters, and spirits perfectly made, and upon all spirits made and distilled of wine; and also for granting and continuing the further additional duties on beer, ale, aqua vitæ, and strong waters, brewed and made in this kingdom; and upon brandy or spirits above proof; and on tea, coffee, chocolate, and cocoa-nuts; and also for granting a further additional duty upon brandy or spirits above proof; and also a tax on all salaries, profits of employments, fees, and pensions therein mentioned; and for securing the repayment of fifty thousand pounds sterl. formerly advanced to his Majesty for the use of the publick, together with the interest there of. (Repealed by Statute Law Revision (Ireland) Act 1878 (41 & 42 Vict. c. 57))
Fraudulent Imports Act 1725 (repealed)	12 Geo. 1. c. 2 (I)	8 March 1726
An Act to prevent the fraudulent and clandestine importing of goods. (Repealed by Statute Law Revision (Ireland) Act 1878 (41 & 42 Vict. c. 57))
Marriage Act 1725^{(Republic of Ireland)}	12 Geo. 1. c. 3 (I)	8 March 1726
An Act to prevent marriages by degraded clergymen and popish priests, and for preventing marriages consummated from being avoided by precontracts, and for the more effectual punishing of bigamy.
Sheriffs Act 1725^{(Republic of Ireland)}	12 Geo. 1. c. 4 (I)	8 March 1726
An Act for the better regulating the office of sheriffs, and for the ascertaining their fees, and the fees for suing out their patents, and passing their accounts.
Butter, Tallow, Hides, Beef, Pork, and Salmon Amendment Act 1725 (repealed)	12 Geo. 1. c. 5 (I)	8 March 1726
An Act for explaining and amending an Act, intituled, "An Act for continuing and amending of the Laws in Relation to Butter and Tallow, and the Casks in which such Goods are to be made up, and in relation to the curing of Hides, and in making up of Beef and Pork for Exportation, and for preventing the Destruction of Salmon." (Note: Butter, Tallow, Hides, Beef, Pork, and Salmon Act 1723 (10 Geo. 1. c. 9 (I))) (Repealed by Statute Law Revision (Ireland) Act 1878 (41 & 42 Vict. c. 57))
Expiring Statutes Continuance and Oaths of Qualification Act 1725 (repealed)	12 Geo. 1. c. 6 (I)	8 March 1726
An Act for continuing several temporary statutes made in this kingdom now near expiring; and for allowing further time to persons in offices to qualify themselves pursuant to an act, intituled, "An Act to prevent the further growth of popery." (Note: Popery Act 1703 (2 Anne c. 6 (I))) (Repealed by Statute Law Revision (Ireland) Act 1878 (41 & 42 Vict. c. 57))
Salmon Fishery Preservation Act 1725 (repealed)	12 Geo. 1. c. 7 (I)	8 March 1726
An Act for the better preserving the Salmon Fishery of this Kingdom. (Repealed by Fisheries (Ireland) Act 1842 (5 & 6 Vict. c. 106))
Felons and Vagabonds Transportation Act 1725 (repealed)	12 Geo. 1. c. 8 (I)	8 March 1726
An Act for the more effectual transporting Felons and Vagabonds. (Repealed by Statute Law Revision (Ireland) Act 1878 (41 & 42 Vict. c. 57))
Free Schools and Churches Act 1725 (repealed)	12 Geo. 1. c. 9 (I)	8 March 1726
An Act for the more effectual and better regulating of Free-Schools, and for rebuilding and repairing of Churches. (Repealed by Statute Law Revision (Ireland) Act 1878 (41 & 42 Vict. c. 57))
Glebe Act 1725	12 Geo. 1. c. 10 (I)	8 March 1726
An Act to amend and explain an Act, intituled, "An Act to encourage building of Houses, and making other Improvements of Church Lands, and to prevent Dilapidations." (Note: Glebe Act 1698 (10 Will. 3. c. 6 (I)))

=== Private acts ===
Short title, or popular name	Citation	Royal assent
Long title
Molesworth's Estate Act 1725	12 Geo. 1. c. 1 Pr. (I)	8 March 1726
An Act for enabling the Right Honourable John, Lord Molesworth, and Richard Molesworth, and the several other persons in remainder for life, when in possession of certain lands near St Stephen's Green and Dawson Street, in the county and city of Dublin, to make leases thereof.
Christ Church Cork Act 1725	12 Geo. 1. c. 2 Pr. (I)	8 March 1726
An Act for finishing the church of Christ Church, in the city of Cork.
Hartstonge's Estate Act 1725	12 Geo. 1. c. 3 Pr. (I)	8 March 1726
An Act for enabling Price Hartstonge, of Bruffe, in the county of Limerick, esquire, to raise the some of £2000 by mortgage of all or any part of the lands of Court and Colum, in the said county, for the purposes therein mentioned.
Hickman's Estate Act 1725	12 Geo. 1. c. 4 Pr. (I)	8 March 1726
An Act to enable Robert Hickman, esquire, to charge his estate for payment of his father's debts and legacies, and to make leases.
Butler's Estate Act 1725	12 Geo. 1. c. 5 Pr. (I)	8 March 1726
An Act to enable Sir Pierce Butler, baronet, and Richard Butler, esquire, son and heir of James Butler, esquire, deceased, only brother of the said Pierce Butler, to make a further settlement of the estate lately belonging to Sir Thomas Butler, deceased, for the benefit of themselves and their family, without prejudice to the jointure of Dame Anne Butler, wife of the said Sir Pierce, or to the provisions made for their issue by the settlement made on their marriage by the said Sir Thomas Butler.
Morres's Estate Act 1725	12 Geo. 1. c. 6 Pr. (I)	8 March 1726
An Act for the relief of Edmond, Catherine, Mary Margaret, and Elizabeth Morres, minors, being the younger children of Sir John Morres, junior, deceased.
Pyke's Estate Act 1725	12 Geo. 1. c. 7 Pr. (I)	8 March 1726
An Act for vesting part of the estate of John Pyke, late of Woodenstown, in the county of Tipperary, esquire, deceased, in certain trustees for sale thereof, in order to pay and discharge his debts and legacies.

=== Sources ===
- "Acts of Parliament by Session: 1725". Irish Legislation Database. Queen's University Belfast.
- "Pre-Union Irish Statutes: 1725 Acts". Irish Statute Book. Attorney General of Ireland.

== 1 Geo. 2 (1727) ==
The 1st session of the parliament of George II, which met from 28 November 1727 until 6 May 1728.

This session was also traditionally cited as 1 G. 2.

=== Public acts ===
Short title, or popular name	Citation	Royal assent
Long title
Import Duties Act 1727 (repealed)	1 Geo. 2. c. 1 (I)	12 December 1727
An Act for granting and continuing to his Majesty the additional duties on beer, ale, strong waters, tobacco, and other goods and merchandizes; and also upon all sorts of wine, strong waters, and spirits perfectly made, and upon all spirits made and distilled of wine; and also for granting and continuing the several further additional duties on beer, ale, aqua vitæ, and strong waters, brewed and made in this kingdom; and upon brandy or spirits above proof; and on tea, coffee, chocolate, and cocoa-nuts. (Repealed by Statute Law Revision (Ireland) Act 1878 (41 & 42 Vict. c. 57))
Oaths of Qualification (Indemnity) Act 1727 (repealed)	1 Geo. 2. c. 2 (I)	12 December 1727
An Act for allowing further Time to Persons in Offices to qualify themselves pursuant to an Act, intituled, "An Act to prevent the further Growth of Popery." (Note: Popery Act 1703 (2 Anne c. 6 (I))) (Repealed by Promissory Oaths Act 1871 (34 & 35 Vict. c. 48))
Bridges Repair Act 1727	1 Geo. 2. c. 3 (I)	12 December 1727
An Act for the more speedy and effectual repair of bridges in the several counties of this kingdom.
Import Duties, Pensions Tax, and Loan Act 1727 (repealed)	1 Geo. 2. c. 4 (I)	19 March 1728
An Act for granting to his Majesty an additional duty on beer, ale, strong waters, wine, tobacco, and other goods and merchandizes therein mentioned; and also a tax on salaries, profits of employments, fees, and pensions; and for securing the repayment of fifty thousand pounds sterling, formerly advanced to his late Majesty for the use of the publick, together with the interest thereof. (Repealed by Statute Law Revision (Ireland) Act 1878 (41 & 42 Vict. c. 57))
Quakers Affirmation Act 1727 (repealed)	1 Geo. 2. c. 5 (I)	19 March 1728
An Act for accepting the solemn affirmation or declaration of the people called Quakers, instead of an oath in the usual form. (Repealed by Statute Law Revision (Ireland) Act 1878 (41 & 42 Vict. c. 57))
Customs and Excise Frauds Act 1727 (repealed)	1 Geo. 2. c. 6 (I)	6 May 1728
An Act for the more effectual preventing several frauds and abuses committed in his Majesty's customs and excise, and for settling the rates of certain goods and merchandizes not particularly valued in the book of rates. (Repealed by Statute Law Revision (Ireland) Act 1878 (41 & 42 Vict. c. 57))
Demise of the Crown Act (Ireland) 1727 (repealed)	1 Geo. 2. c. 7 (I)	6 May 1728
An Act to continue the Parliament for the Time being on the Demise of his present most gracious Majesty, or any of His Heirs or Successors, for the Term of six Months from the Day of the said Demise; and likewise to prevent the Publick Funds from expiring during the said Term. (Repealed by Statute Law Revision (Ireland) Act 1878 (41 & 42 Vict. c. 57))
Privilege of Parliament Act 1727 or the Privilege of Parliament Act (Ireland) 1727	1 Geo. 2. c. 8 (I)	6 May 1728
An Act for preventing inconveniencies that may happen by privilege of Parliament. (Repealed for the Republic of Ireland by Statute Law Revision (Pre-Union Irish Statutes) Act 1962 (No. 29))
Disfranchising Act 1727 or the Disenfranchisement Act 1727 (repealed)	1 Geo. 2. c. 9 (I)	6 May 1728
An Act for the further regulating the Election of Members of Parliament, and preventing the irregular Proceedings of Sheriffs and other Officers in electing and returning such Members. (Repealed by Statute Law Revision (Ireland) Act 1878 (41 & 42 Vict. c. 57))
Corn Measures and Husbandry Act 1727	1 Geo. 2. c. 10 (I)	6 May 1728
An Act for regulating the measures made use of in buying and selling of corn, and for promoting husbandry in this kingdom.
Hempen and Flaxen Manufactures Act 1727	1 Geo. 2. c. 11 (I)	6 May 1728
An Act for the further improvement of the hempen and flaxen manufactures of this kingdom.
Small Value Tithes Recovery Act 1727 (repealed)	1 Geo. 2. c. 12 (I)	6 May 1728
An Act for the more easy Recovery of Tythes and other Ecclesiastical Dues of small Value. (Repealed by Statute Law Revision (Ireland) Act 1878 (41 & 42 Vict. c. 57))
Highways and Roads Amendment Act 1727	1 Geo. 2. c. 13 (I)	6 May 1728
An Act for explaining and amending several laws made for amending the highways and roads in this kingdom; and for the application of the six days labour.
Small Debts Recovery Act 1727 (repealed)	1 Geo. 2. c. 14 (I)	6 May 1728
An Act for explaining and amending an Act, (Note: Small Debts Recovery Act 1715 (2 Geo. 1. c. 11 (I))) intituled, "An Act for reviving and amending an Act, (Note: Small Debts Recovery Act 1704 (2 Anne c. 18 (I))) intituled, 'An Act for Recovery of Small Debts in a summary Way before the Judges of Assize.'" (Repealed by Civil Bill Courts (Ireland) Act 1851 (14 & 15 Vict. c. 57))
Clergy Residence and Protestant Schools Amendment Act 1727 (repealed)	1 Geo. 2. c. 15 (I)	6 May 1728
An Act for rendering more effectual an Act, intituled, "An Act for the better enabling of the Clergy having cure of Souls to reside upon their respective Benefices; and for the Encouragement of Protestant Schools within this Kingdom of Ireland." (Note: Clergy Residence and Protestant Schools Act 1721 (8 Geo. 1. c. 12 (I))) (Repealed by Statute Law Revision (Ireland) Act 1878 (41 & 42 Vict. c. 57))
Bread Price and Assize Act 1727 (repealed)	1 Geo. 2. c. 16 (I)	6 May 1728
An Act for regulating the Price and Assize of Bread, and the Markets. (Repealed by Statute Law Revision (Ireland) Act 1878 (41 & 42 Vict. c. 57))
Expiring Statutes Continuance Act 1727 (repealed)	1 Geo. 2. c. 17 (I)	6 May 1728
An Act for continuing several temporary Statutes made in this Kingdom, now near expiring. (Repealed by Statute Law Revision (Ireland) Act 1878 (41 & 42 Vict. c. 57))
Ecclesiastical Benefices and Woods Act 1727	1 Geo. 2. c. 18 (I)	6 May 1728
An Act to enable Archbishops, Bishops, and other ecclesiastical Persons and Corporations, to grant their patronage, or Right of Presentation, or Nomination to small Livings, to such Persons as shall augment the same; and also to enable Archbishops and Bishops, and other ecclesiastical Persons therein mentioned, to make Agreements with their Tenants for the inclosing and improving their Woods.
Ecclesiastical Benefices and Woods Act 1727 (repealed)	1 Geo. 2. c. 19 (I)	6 May 1728
An Act for repealing a Clause in an Act, intituled, "An Act for real Union and Division of Parishes;" (Note: Parish Union and Division Act 1715 (2 Geo. 1. c. 14 (I))) and for settling the Method of obtaining the King's Majesty's Consent for removing the Situation of Churches, the Patronage whereof is in the Crown. (Repealed by Statute Law Revision (Ireland) Act 1878 (41 & 42 Vict. c. 57))
Barristers, Solicitors, and Offices Regulation Act 1727 (repealed)	1 Geo. 2. c. 20 (I)	6 May 1728
An Act for regulating the Admissions of Barristers at Law, six Clerks, and Attorneys, and of other Persons, into Offices and Employments; and for preventing Papists practicing as Solicitors: and for further strengthening the Protestant Interest in this Kingdom. (Repealed by Promissory Oaths Act 1871 (34 & 35 Vict. c. 48))
Coals Combinations and Abuses Act 1727	1 Geo. 2. c. 21 (I)	6 May 1728
An Act for preventing Combinations to enhance the Prices, and for avoiding Exactions and Abuses formerly practised in the Sale and Measure of Coals.
Maintenance of Curates Amendment Act 1727	1 Geo. 2. c. 22 (I)	6 May 1728
An Act for explaining and amending an Act, intituled, "An Act for the better Maintenance of Curates within the Church of Ireland." (Note: Maintenance of Curates Act 1719 (6 Geo. 1. c. 13 (I)))
Advowson and Presentation Rights Act 1727 (repealed)	1 Geo. 2. c. 23 (I)	6 May 1728
An Act for the better securing the Rights of Advowson and Presentation to Ecclesiastical Benefices. (Repealed by Statute Law Revision (Ireland) Act 1878 (41 & 42 Vict. c. 57))
Servants Embezzlement and Mines Destruction Act 1727 (repealed)	1 Geo. 2. c. 24 (I)	6 May 1728
An Act for preventing the embezzling of Goods under the Value of forty Shillings by Servants; and the malicious Destruction of Engines and other Things belonging to mines. (Repealed by Criminal Statutes (Ireland) Repeal Act 1828 (9 Geo. 4. c. 53))
Relief of Insolvent Debtors Act 1727 (repealed)	1 Geo. 2. c. 25 (I)	6 May 1728
An Act for the relief of insolvent debtors. (Repealed by Statute Law Revision (Ireland) Act 1878 (41 & 42 Vict. c. 57))
North Strand Inclosure Act 1727 (repealed)	1 Geo. 2. c. 26 (I)	6 May 1728
An Act for the more speedy and effectual inclosing the Strand on the North Side of the River Anna-Liffey near the City of Dublin. (Repealed by Statute Law Revision (Ireland) Act 1878 (41 & 42 Vict. c. 57))
Dublin Workhouse, Poor, and Gunpowder Act 1727	1 Geo. 2. c. 27 (I)	6 May 1728h
An Act for the better regulating the Work-House of the City of Dublin, and to regulate and provide for the Poor thereof; and to prevent Mischiefs, which may happen by keeping Gun Powder within the said City.

=== Private acts ===
Short title, or popular name	Citation	Royal assent
Long title
Foy's Charity Act 1727	1 Geo. 2. c. 1 Pr. (I)	6 May 1728
An Act for perpetuating and regulating the charitable foundation of Doctor Nathaniel Foy, late bishop of Waterford and Lismore, in the city of Waterford.
Bingham's Estate Act 1727	1 Geo. 2. c. 2 Pr. (I)	6 May 1728
An Act to enable John Bingham, esquire, to pay debts, and secure portions on his real estate for his younger children, as also for his younger brother George Bingham, a minor.
Parsons' Children Act 1727	1 Geo. 2. c. 3 Pr. (I)	6 May 1728
An Act for the relief of the younger children of William Parsons, esquire, deceased.

=== Sources ===
- "Acts of Parliament by Session: 1727". Irish Legislation Database. Queen's University Belfast.

== 3 Geo. 2 (1729) ==
The 2nd session of the parliament of George II, which met from 23 September 1729 until 15 April 1730.

This session was also traditionally cited as 3 G. 2.

=== Public acts ===
Short title, or popular name	Citation	Royal assent
Long title
Import Duties Act 1729 (repealed)	3 Geo. 2. c. 1 (I)	22 December 1729
An Act for granting to his majesty a further additional duty on beer, ale, strong waters, wine, tobacco, and other goods and merchandizes therein mentioned. (Repealed by Statute Law Revision (Ireland) Act 1878 (41 & 42 Vict. c. 57))
Wines Duties, Pensions Tax, and Loan Act 1729 (repealed)	3 Geo. 2. c. 2 (I)	22 December 1729
An Act for granting to his Majesty a further additional duty on wine, strong waters, brandy, and spirits; and also a tax of four shillings in the pound on all salaries, profits of employments, fees, and pensions to be applied to pay an interest at the rate of fix pounds per cent. per annum, for the sum of two hundred thousand pounds, and towards the discharge of the said principal sum. (Repealed by Statute Law Revision (Ireland) Act 1878 (41 & 42 Vict. c. 57))
Tillage, Bogs, Duties, and Wool Export Act 1729 (repealed)	3 Geo. 2. c. 3 (I)	15 April 1730
An Act for the Encouragement of Tillage; and better Employment of the Poor; and also for the more effectual putting in Execution an Act, intituled, "An Act to encourage the draining and improving of Bogs, and unprofitable low Grounds, and for easing and dispatching the Inland Carriage and Conveyance of Goods from one Part to another within this Kingdom;" (Note: Bogs Draining and Inland Carriage Act 1715 (2 Geo. 1. c. 12 (I))) and also for laying several Duties upon Coaches, Berlins, Chariots, Calashes, Chaises, and Chairs, and upon Cards and Dice, and upon wrought and manufactured Gold and Silver Plate imported into or made in Ireland for the Purposes therein mentioned; and also for repealing the Duties payable upon the Exportation of Wooll, Bay-yarn, and Woollen-yarn, out of this Kingdom for England. (Repealed by Statute Law Revision (Ireland) Act 1878 (41 & 42 Vict. c. 57))
Perjury Act 1729^{(Republic of Ireland)}	3 Geo. 2. c. 4 (I)	15 April 1730
An Act for the more effectual preventing and further punishment of forgery, perjury, and subornation of perjury, and to make it felony to steal bonds, notes, or other securities for payment of money, and for the more effectual transporting felons, vagabonds, and others.
Expiring Statutes Continuance Act 1729 (repealed)	3 Geo. 2. c. 5 (I)	15 April 1730
An Act for continuing several Temporary Statutes made in this Kingdom, and now near expiring, and for the Amendment of other Statutes therein mentioned. (Repealed by Statute Law Revision (Ireland) Act 1878 (41 & 42 Vict. c. 57))
Oaths of Qualification (Indemnity) Act 1729 (repealed)	3 Geo. 2. c. 6 (I)	15 April 1730
An Act for allowing further time to persons in offices to qualify themselves, pursuant to an act, entitled, "An Act to prevent the further growth of Popery." (Note: Popery Act 1703 (2 Anne c. 6 (I))) (Repealed by Statute Law Revision (Ireland) Act 1878 (41 & 42 Vict. c. 57))
Discovery of Judgments and Purchasers Security Act 1729 (repealed)	3 Geo. 2. c. 7 (I)	15 April 1730
An Act for the better Discovery of Judgments in the Courts of King's Bench, Common Pleas, and Exchequer, at Dublin; and for the greater Security of Purchasers. (Repealed by Statute Law Revision (Ireland) Act 1878 (41 & 42 Vict. c. 57))
Parliament House Act 1729 (repealed)	3 Geo. 2. c. 8 (I)	15 April 1730
An Act to enable his Majesty to purchase in the respective interests of the several persons intitled to the houses and grounds adjoyning to the new Parliament-house. (Repealed by Statute Law Revision (Ireland) Act 1878 (41 & 42 Vict. c. 57))
Sheriffs Act 1729^{(Republic of Ireland)}	3 Geo. 2. c. 9 (I)	15 April 1730
An Act for the further explaining and amending several statutes for prohibiting under sheriffs and sheriffs clerks from officiating as sub-sheriffs or sheriffs clerks more than one year; and to render more effectual an act to prevent fees being taken in certain cases; and to take away the pretended office of barony-clerk, and to oblige sheriffs to appoint deputies for granting replevins; and also for discharging of prisoners unable to pay their fees.
Marching Soldiers Act 1729 (repealed)	3 Geo. 2. c. 10 (I)	15 April 1730
An Act for explaining and amending an act, intituled, "An act to prevent the disorders that may happen by the marching of soldiers, and for providing carriages for the baggage of soldiers in their march." (Note: Marching Soldiers Act 1707 (6 Anne c. 14 (I))) (Repealed by Statute Law Revision (Ireland) Act 1878 (41 & 42 Vict. c. 57))
Churches Repair Act 1729 (repealed)	3 Geo. 2. c. 11 (I)	15 April 1730
An Act for the better keeping Churches in Repair. (Repealed by Statute Law Revision (Ireland) Act 1878 (41 & 42 Vict. c. 57))
Clergy Residence and Protestant Schools Amendment Act 1729 (repealed)	3 Geo. 2. c. 12 (I)	15 April 1730
An Act for supplying a Defect in an Act (Note: Clergy Residence and Protestant Schools Amendment Act 1727 (1 Geo. 2. c. 15 (I))) for rendering more effectual an Act (Note: Clergy Residence and Protestant Schools Act 1721 (8 Geo. 1. c. 12 (I))) for the better enabling the Clergy having Cure of Soules to reside upon their respective Benefices; and for the Encouragement of Protestant Schools within this Kingdom of Ireland. (Repealed by Church of Ireland Acts Repeal Act 1851 (14 & 15 Vict. c. 71))
City of Dublin Act 1729^{(Republic of Ireland)}	3 Geo. 2. c. 13 (I)	15 April 1730
An Act for explaining and amending the several laws now in force for the paving and cleansing the streets of the city of Dublin, and the liberties of Saint Sepulchre's, Thomas-court, and Donore, and for other purposes therein mentioned.
Workmen's Combinations, Wages, and Bricks Act 1729	3 Geo. 2. c. 14 (I)	15 April 1730
An Act to prevent unlawful combinations of Workmen, Artificers, and Labourers employed in the several Trades and Manufactures of this Kingdom, and for the better Payment of their Wages; as also to prevent Abuses in making of Bricks, and to ascertain their Dimensions.
Trial of Criminals Act 1729 (repealed)	3 Geo. 2. c. 15 (I)	15 April 1730
An Act for the more speedy tryal of criminals in the county of the city of Dublin, and county of Dublin. (Repealed for the Republic of Ireland by Statute Law Revision (Pre-Union Irish Statutes) Act 1962 (No. 29))
Justices of the Peace Fees Act 1729 (repealed)	3 Geo. 2. c. 16 (I)	15 April 1730
An Act for the better regulating Fees of Justice of the Peace, and for disabling Alderman Thomas Wilkinson, and Alderman Thomas Bolton from acting as Justices of the Peace within this Kingdom. (Repealed by Statute Law Revision (Ireland) Act 1878 (41 & 42 Vict. c. 57))
Dublin Workhouse, Poor, and Lunatics Act 1729	3 Geo. 2. c. 17 (I)	15 April 1730
An act for the better enabling the governors of the work-house of the city of Dublin to provide for and employ the poor therein, and for the more effectual punishment of vagabonds; and also for the better securing of and providing for lunaticks and foundling children.
Dublin to Kilcullen Road Act 1729	3 Geo. 2. c. 18 (I)	15 April 1730
An act for repairing the road leading from the city of Dublin (Note: Dublin.) to Kilcullen-bridge, (Note: Kilcullen, County Kildare.) in the county of Kildare.
Dublin to Navan Road Act 1729	3 Geo. 2. c. 19 (I)	15 April 1730
An Act for repairing the road leading from the City of Dublin, to the Town of Navan, (Note: Navan, County Meath.) in the County of Meath.
Relief of Insolvent Debtors Act 1729 (repealed)	3 Geo. 2. c. 20 (I)	15 April 1730
An act for the relief of insolvent debtors. (Repealed by Statute Law Revision (Ireland) Act 1878 (41 & 42 Vict. c. 57))
Ballast Offices Act 1729^{(Republic of Ireland)}	3 Geo. 2. c. 21 (I)	15 April 1730
An Act for cleansing the ports, harbours, and rivers of the city of Cork, and of the towns of Gallway, Sligoe, Drogheda, and Belfast; and for erecting a ballast-office in the said city, and each of the said towns.
Dublin, Cork, and Limerick Street Lights Amendment Act 1729 (repealed)	3 Geo. 2. c. 22 (I)	15 April 1730
An Act for explaining and amending an act made in the sixth year of his late majesty King George I, entitled "An Act for erecting and continuing lights in the city of Dublin and the several liberties adjoining, and also in the cities of Cork and Limerick and liberties thereof." (Note: Dublin, Cork, and Limerick Street Lights Act 1719 (6 Geo. 1. c. 18 (I))) (Repealed by Statute Law Revision (Ireland) Act 1878 (41 & 42 Vict. c. 57))
Dr. Steven's Hospital Act 1729^{(Republic of Ireland)}	3 Geo. 2. c. 23 (I)	15 April 1730
An Act for finishing and regulating the hospital founded by Richard Stephens esquire, doctor of Physick.

=== Private acts ===
Short title, or popular name	Citation	Royal assent
Long title
Austin's Divorce Act 1729	3 Geo. 2. c. 1 Pr. (I)	15 April 1730
An Act to dissolve the marriage of Joseph Austin, of the city of Cork, merchant, with Mary Mitchell, and to enable him to marry again.
French's Estate Act 1729	3 Geo. 2. c. 2 Pr. (I)	15 April 1730
An Act for vesting part of the estate of Nicholas Ambrose French, of the city of London, gentleman, in trustees, to be sold for payment of debts and encumbrances affecting his estate, and for confirming and establishing unto John Digby esquire, and his heirs, and unto the assigns of the right Reverend Simon Digby, late Bishop of Elphin, the lands purchased by him from Nicholas French, of Corgery, in County Galway, esquire, father of the said Nicholas Ambrose French.
Odell's Estate Act 1729	3 Geo. 2. c. 3 Pr. (I)	15 April 1730
An Act for the relief of the younger children of John Odell, esquire, deceased.
Wolseley's Estate Act 1729	3 Geo. 2. c. 4 Pr. (I)	15 April 1730
An Act to enable Richard Wolseley, esquire, and other persons interested in common with him in the manor and lands of Moynart, and other lands in county Wexford, and the woods thereon, to come to a partition and division thereof.
Kenney's Estate Act 1729	3 Geo. 2. c. 5 Pr. (I)	15 April 1730
An Act to enable Henry Kenney, esquire, and Elizabeth Kenney, alias Dodwell, his wife, to sell the said Elizabeth's estate, lying and dispersed in the counties of Roscommon, Westmeath, town of Athlone, and city of Dublin, far distant from the said Henry's mansion house and estate in county Wexford, and with the money arising by such sale to purchase other lands more contiguous, to be settled to the same uses mentioned in their marriage articles.

=== Sources ===
- "Acts of Parliament by Session: 1729". Irish Legislation Database. Queen's University Belfast.
- "Pre-Union Irish Statutes: 1729 Acts". Irish Statute Book. Attorney General of Ireland.

== See also ==
- List of acts of the Parliament of Ireland
- List of acts of the Oireachtas
- List of legislation in the United Kingdom
