= List of acts of the Parliament of Ireland, 1711–1720 =

This is a list of acts of the Parliament of Ireland for the years from 1711 to 1720.

The number shown by each act's title is its chapter number. Acts are cited using this number, preceded by the years of the reign during which the relevant parliamentary session was held; thus the act concerning assay passed in 1783 is cited as "23 & 24 Geo. 3. c. 23", meaning the 23rd act passed during the session that started in the 23rd year of the reign of George III and which finished in the 24th year of that reign. Note that the modern convention is to use Arabic numerals in citations (thus "40 Geo. 3" rather than "40 Geo. III"). Acts of the reign of Elizabeth I are formally cited without a regnal numeral in the Republic of Ireland.

Acts passed by the Parliament of Ireland did not have a short title; however, some of these acts have subsequently been given a short title by acts of the Parliament of the United Kingdom, acts of the Parliament of Northern Ireland, or acts of the Oireachtas. This means that some acts have different short titles in the Republic of Ireland and Northern Ireland respectively. Official short titles are indicated by the flags of the respective jurisdictions.

A number of the acts included in this list are still in force in Northern Ireland or the Republic of Ireland. Because these two jurisdictions are entirely separate, the version of an act in force in one may differ from the version in force in the other; similarly, an act may have been repealed in one but not in the other.

A number of acts passed by the Parliament of England or the Parliament of Great Britain also extended to Ireland during this period.

== 11 Anne (1712) ==
The 6th session of the 1st parliament of Anne, which met from 9 July 1711 until 9 November 1711.

This session was also traditionally cited as 11 Ann.

=== Public acts ===
Short title, or popular name	Citation	Royal assent
Long title
Import Duties Act 1712 (repealed)	11 Anne c. 1 (I)	9 November 1711
An Act for granting to her Majesty an additional duty on beer, ale, strong waters, tobacco, and other goods and merchandizes. (Repealed by Statute Law Revision (Ireland) Act 1878 (41 & 42 Vict. c. 57))
Distress for Rent Act 1712^{(Republic of Ireland)}	11 Anne c. 2 (I)	9 November 1711
An Act for the more effectual preventing of frauds committed by tenants.
Guardians' Lease Renewals Act 1712 (repealed)	11 Anne c. 3 (I)	9 November 1711
An Act to enable guardians and others to renew leases for lives. (Repealed by Infants' Property Act 1830 (11 Geo. 4 & 1 Will. 4. c. 65))
Coals Engrossing and Forestalling Act 1712 (repealed)	11 Anne c. 4 (I)	9 November 1711
An Act for the more effectual preventing the ingrossing, forestalling, and regrating of coals, imported into this kingdom. (Repealed by Statute Law Revision (Ireland) Act 1878 (41 & 42 Vict. c. 57))
Gaming Act 1712	11 Anne c. 5 (I)	9 November 1711
An Act for the better preventing of excessive and deceitful gaming.
Lotteries Act 1712	11 Anne c. 6 (I)	9 November 1711
An Act for supressing lotteries.
Game Act 1712	11 Anne c. 7 (I)	9 November 1711
An Act for the better preservation of the game.
Sheriffs Act 1712^{(Republic of Ireland)}	11 Anne c. 8 (I)	9 November 1711
An Act for explaining and amending several statutes, for prohibiting under-sheriffs and sheriffs-clerks from officiating as sub-sheriffs or sheriffs-clerks more than one year.

=== Private acts ===
Short title, or popular name	Citation	Royal assent
Long title
Countess of Tyrone's Estate Act 1712	11 Anne c. 1 Pr. (I)	9 November 1711
An Act to enable the Right Honourable Anne, countess of Tyrone, during her life, or such person or persons as after her decease shall be guardian or guardians to the Lady Catherine Power, daughter of James, late earl of Tyrone, to set leases of the estate of said earl for a term not exceeding 31 years, at a full and improved rent without fine.
Bernard's and Pen's Estate Act 1712	11 Anne c. 2 Pr. (I)	9 November 1711
An Act to vest the inheritance of certain lands in the barony of Ibaune and Barryroe in the county of Cork in Francis Bernard, esquire, and his heirs, and to vest certain terms for years in the said lands in Stephen and Peter Ludlow, esquires, respectively, in trust for the said Francis Bernard, pursuant to an agreement made between the said Francis Bernard and William Pen, senior, and William Pen, junior, esquires, for the purchase of the said lands.
Rawdon's Relief Act 1712	11 Anne c. 3 Pr. (I)	9 November 1711
An Act for explaining an act passed in a former session of this present parliament entitled "An Act for the relief of Dorothy Rawdon, spinster." (Note: Rawdon's Relief Act 1709 (8 Anne c. 6 Pr. (I)))
Walsh's Estate Act 1712	11 Anne c. 4 Pr. (I)	9 November 1711
An Act for the sale of the town and lands of Cork, alias Corkagh, situate in the county of Dublin, part of the estate of John Walsh, esquire, for the payment of debts contracted by Edward Walsh, esquire, his deceased brother, now affecting said lands and other lands, the estate of said John.
Donelan's Estate Act 1712	11 Anne c. 5 Pr. (I)	9 November 1711
An Act for enabling James Donelan of Cloghan in County Roscommon, esquire, to sell or mortgage certain lands or tenements for payment of his debts, and for securing a jointure to his wife.

=== Sources ===
- "The eleventh Year of Anne". Statutes Passed in the Parliaments Held in Ireland. Vol. II: From the Seventeenth and Eighteenth Years of Charles the Second, A.D. 1665, to the Eleventh Year of Anne, A.D. 1712, inclusive. Dublin: George Grierson. 1794. pp. 595–610 – via Google Books.
- "Acts of Parliament by Session: 1711". Irish Legislation Database. Queen's University Belfast.
- "Pre-Union Irish Statutes: 1712 Acts". Irish Statute Book. Attorney General of Ireland.

== 12 Anne (1713) ==
The 2nd parliament of Anne, which met from 25 November 1713 until 24 December 1714.

This session was also traditionally cited as 12 Ann.

No private acts were passed in this parliament.

=== Public acts ===
Short title, or popular name	Citation	Royal assent
Long title
Additional Duties Act 1713	12 Anne c. 1 (I)	22 December 1713
An Act for granting to her majesty an additional duty on beer, ale, strong waters, tobacco, and all other goods and merchandises.

=== Sources ===
- "Acts of Parliament by Session: 1713". Irish Legislation Database. Queen's University Belfast.

== 2 Geo. 1 (1715) ==
The 1st session of the parliament of George I, which met from 12 November 1715 until 20 June 1716.

This session was also traditionally cited as 2 G. 1.

=== Public acts ===
Short title, or popular name	Citation	Royal assent
Long title
Import Duties Act 1715 (repealed)	2 Geo. 1. c. 1 (I)	21 November 1715
An Act for granting to his Majesty an additional duty on beer, ale, strong waters, tobacco, and other goods and merchandizes. (Repealed by Statute Law Revision (Ireland) Act 1878 (41 & 42 Vict. c. 57))
Crown Title Recognition Act 1715 (repealed)	2 Geo. 1. c. 2 (I)	21 November 1715
An Act for recognizing his Majesty's title to the throne of Great-Britain, France, and Ireland. (Repealed by Statute Law Revision (Ireland) Act 1878 (41 & 42 Vict. c. 57))
Wines Duties and Salaries Tax Act 1715 (repealed)	2 Geo. 1. c. 3 (I)	28 January 1716
An Act for granting to his Majesty an additional duty on all wines and strong waters, and spirits perfectly made, and upon all spirits made and distilled of wine; and also a tax on sallaries, profits of imployments, fees, and pensions therein mentioned. (Repealed by Statute Law Revision (Ireland) Act 1878 (41 & 42 Vict. c. 57))
The Pretender Attainder Act 1715 (repealed)	2 Geo. 1. c. 4 (I)	28 January 1716
An Act to attaint the person who, during the life of the late King James, (Note: James II of England.) took upon him the stile and title of prince of Wales, and since the decease of the said late King James hath assumed the name and title of James the third, King of England and Ireland, and James the eighth King of Scotland, commonly called, the Chevalier de St. George, or the pretender, (Note: James Francis Edward Stuart.) and all his adherents, and to give a reward of fifty thousand pounds sterl. to any person, who shall seize and secure the said pretender, if he lands, or attempts to land, in this kingdom. (Repealed by Statute Law Revision (Ireland) Act 1878 (41 & 42 Vict. c. 57))
Accidental Fires Act 1715	2 Geo. 1. c. 5 (I)	28 January 1716
An Act for preventing mischiefs that may happen by fire.
Infant Trustees and Mortgagees Act 1715	2 Geo. 1. c. 6 (I)	28 January 1716
An Act to enable infants, who are seized or possessed of estates in fee, in trust, or by way of mortgage, to make conveyances of such estates.
Import Duties (No. 2) Act 1716 (repealed)	2 Geo. 1. c. 7 (I)	19 May 1716
An Act for continuing to his Majesty the additional duty on beer, ale, strong waters, tobacco, and other goods and merchandizes. (Repealed by Statute Law Revision (Ireland) Act 1878 (41 & 42 Vict. c. 57))
County Palatine of Tipperary Act 1715^{(Republic of Ireland)}	2 Geo. 1. c. 8 (I)	20 June 1716
An Act for extinguishing the regalities and liberties of the county of Tipperary, and Cross-Tipperary, commonly called the County Palatine of Tipperary; and for vesting in his Majesty the estate of James Butler, commonly called James duke of Ormond; and for giving a reward of ten thousand pounds to any person, who shall seize of secure him, in case he shall attempt to land in this kingdom.
Militia Act (Ireland) 1715 (repealed)	2 Geo. 1. c. 9 (I)	20 June 1716
An Act to make the Militia of this Kingdom more useful. (Repealed by Statute Law Revision (Ireland) Act 1879 (42 & 43 Vict. c. 24))
Papist Constables and Parish Watches Act 1715 (repealed)	2 Geo. 1. c. 10 (I)	20 June 1716
An Act to restrain Papists from being High or Petty Constables, and for the better Regulating the Parish Watches. (Repealed by Statute Law Revision (Ireland) Act 1879 (42 & 43 Vict. c. 24))
Small Debts Recovery Act 1715 (repealed)	2 Geo. 1. c. 11 (I)	20 June 1716
An Act for reviving and amending an act, intituled, "An Act for recovery of small debts in a summary way, before the judges of assize." (Note: Small Debts Recovery Act 1704 (2 Anne c. 18 (I))) (Repealed for the Republic of Ireland by Statute Law Revision (Pre-Union Irish Statutes) Act 1962 (No. 29) and for Northern Ireland by the Statute Law Revision Act 1950 (14 Geo. 6. c. 6))
Bogs Draining and Inland Carriage Act 1715 (repealed)	2 Geo. 1. c. 12 (I)	20 June 1716
An Act to encourage the draining and improving of the bogs, and unprofitable low grounds; and for easing and dispatching the inland carriage, and conveyance of goods, from one part to another within this kingdom. (Repealed by Statute Law Revision (Ireland) Act 1878 (41 & 42 Vict. c. 57))
Flaxen and Hempen Manufactures Act 1715	2 Geo. 1. c. 13 (I)	20 June 1716
An Act for continuing the encouragement given by former acts of Parliament to the flaxen and hempen manufactures, and for the further improvement and regulation of the same.
Parish Union and Division Act 1715 (repealed)	2 Geo. 1. c. 14 (I)	20 June 1716
An Act for Real Union and Division of Parishes. (Repealed by Statute Law Revision (Ireland) Act 1878 (41 & 42 Vict. c. 57))
First Fruits Act 1715 (repealed)	2 Geo. 1. c. 15 (I)	20 June 1716
An Act for confirming the several grants made by her late Majesty of the first fruits and twentieth parts, payable out of the ecclesiastical benefices in this kingdom; and also for giving the archbishops, bishops, and other ecclesiastical persons, for years time for the payment of first fruits. (Repealed by Church Temporalities (Ireland) Act 1833 (3 & 4 Will. 4. c. 37))
Packing of Tallow Act 1715^{(Republic of Ireland)}	2 Geo. 1. c. 16 (I)	20 June 1716
An Act for the more effectual amendment of the law in relation to butter and tallow casks, and of an act (Note: Timber Act 1710 (9 Anne c. 5 (I))) for planting and preserving timber-trees and woods; and of another act (Note: Sale of Livestock Act 1703 (2 Anne c. 15 (I))) for prohibiting butchers from being graziers, and to redress several abuses in buying and selling of cattle, and in the slaughtering and packing of beef, tallow, and hides. (Repealed for the Republic of Ireland by Statute Law Revision (Pre-Union Irish Statutes) Act 1962 (No. 29))
Servants Act 1715^{(Republic of Ireland)}	2 Geo. 1. c. 17 (I)	20 June 1716
An Act to impower justices of the peace to determine disputes about servants, artificers, day-labourers, wages, and other small demands, and to oblige masters to pay the same, and to punish idle and disorderly servants.
Brandy Importation Act 1715 (repealed)	2 Geo. 1. c. 18 (I)	20 June 1716
An Act for preventing abuses and deceits in His Majesty's Revenue, by the importing of Brandy in small quantities. (Repealed by Statute Law Revision (Ireland) Act 1878 (41 & 42 Vict. c. 57))
Parliamentary Elections Act 1715	2 Geo. 1. c. 19 (I)	20 June 1716
An Act for the more effectual preventing fraudulent Conveyances, in order to multiply Votes for electing Members to serve in Parliament; and for preventing the irregular Proceedings of Sheriffs, and other officers in electing and returning such Members.
Slander Act 1715	2 Geo. 1. c. 20 (I)	20 June 1716
An Act to limit the time for criminal prosecution for words spoken.
Salmon Fishing Act 1715 (repealed)	2 Geo. 1. c. 21 (I)	20 June 1716
An Act to prevent the destruction of salmon fry, and better preserving the salmon fishing in this kingdom. (Repealed by Fisheries (Ireland) Act 1842 (5 & 6 Vict. c. 106))
Maiming of Cattle Act 1715 (repealed)	2 Geo. 1. c. 22 (I)	20 June 1716
An Act to make more effectual, "An Act to prevent the maiming of cattle." (Note: Maiming of Cattle Act 1710 (9 Anne c. 11 (I))) (Repealed by Criminal Statutes (Ireland) Repeal Act 1828 (9 Geo. 4. c. 53))
Relief of Insolvent Debtors Act 1715 (repealed)	2 Geo. 1. c. 23 (I)	20 June 1716
An Act for the relief of insolvent debtors. (Repealed by Statute Law Revision (Ireland) Act 1878 (41 & 42 Vict. c. 57))
St. Werburgh's Church Act 1715 (repealed)	2 Geo. 1. c. 24 (I)	20 June 1716
An Act for changing the scite and new building of the parish-church of St. Werburg's in the city of Dublin. (Repealed by Statute Law Revision (Ireland) Act 1878 (41 & 42 Vict. c. 57))

=== Private acts ===
Short title, or popular name	Citation	Royal assent
Long title
Viscount Loftus's Estate Act 1715	2 Geo. 1. c. 1 Pr. (I)	19 May 1716
An Act for vesting part of the estate of the Right Honourable Arthur, Lord Viscount Loftus of Ely, Letitia, Lady Viscountess, his now wife, and Mary, countess of Drogheda, in trustees, for payment of debts and other uses.
Wall's Estate Act 1715	2 Geo. 1. c. 2 Pr. (I)	20 June 1716
An Act for better enabling William Wall of Coolnemuckey in County Waterford, esquire, to sell certain woods.
Ford's Estate Act 1715	2 Geo. 1. c. 3 Pr. (I)	20 June 1716
An Act to enable William Ford of the city of Limerick, esquire, to settle a jointure, or make some other provision for his present wife, in case she happens to survive him.
Hamilton's Estate Act 1715	2 Geo. 1. c. 4 Pr. (I)	20 June 1716
An Act for sale of part of the estate of James Hamilton, late of Bangor in the county of Down, esquire, deceased, for raising his daughters portions.
Hamerton's Estate Act 1715	2 Geo. 1. c. 5 Pr. (I)	20 June 1716
An Act for vesting certain lands and tenements belonging to Robert Hamerton, esquire, in trustees, to be sold for raising money to discharge the debts and encumbrances of his father, Richard Hamerton.
Frend's Estate Act 1715	2 Geo. 1. c. 6 Pr. (I)	20 June 1716
An Act for vesting certain lands and tenements in the county of Limerick belonging to Samuel Frend, esquire, in trustees, to be sold for raising money to discharge the debts and encumbrances of the said Samuel Frend, esquire, and for other uses and purposes therein mentioned.
Harris's Estate Act 1715	2 Geo. 1. c. 7 Pr. (I)	20 June 1716
An Act to enable Walter Harris, esquire, eldest son and heir of Walter Harris the elder, late of the city of Dublin, merchant, deceased, to raise the sum of £1,200 by mortgage of part of his estate for payment of the debts, portions and other encumbrances charged thereon by his father the said Walter Harris, the elder, and to make leases for lives renewable of part thereof, not diminishing the present yearly value, and to charge the same with reasonable portions for his own younger children.

=== Sources ===
- "Acts of Parliament by Session: 1715". Irish Legislation Database. Queen's University Belfast.

== 4 Geo. 1 (1717) ==
The 2nd session of the parliament of George I, which met from 27 August 1717 until 23 December 1717.

This session was also traditionally cited as 4 G. 1.

=== Public acts ===
Short title, or popular name	Citation	Royal assent
Long title
Import Duties Act 1717 (repealed)	4 Geo. 1. c. 1 (I)	20 November 1717
An Act for continuing to her Majesty the additional duties on beer, ale, strong waters, tobacco, and other goods and merchandizes. (Repealed by Statute Law Revision (Ireland) Act 1878 (41 & 42 Vict. c. 57))
Wines Duties, Pensions Tax, and Loan Act 1717 (repealed)	4 Geo. 1. c. 2 (I)	20 November 1717
An Act for continuing to his Majesty an additional duty on all wines and strong waters, and spirits perfectly made, and upon all spirits made and distilled of wine; and also a tax on all salaries, profits of imployments, fees, and pensions therein mentioned; and for granting a further additional duty on ale, beer, and strong waters, and spirits perfectly made, and upon all spirits made and distilled of wine; and for securing the re-payment of fifty thousand pounds sterl. formerly advanced unto his Majesty for the use of the publick, together with the interest thereof. (Repealed by Statute Law Revision (Ireland) Act 1878 (41 & 42 Vict. c. 57))
Corporation Oaths Abolition Act 1717 (repealed)	4 Geo. 1. c. 3 (I)	20 November 1717
An Act for taking away the oath, commonly called the little oath, on members of corporations by the new rules. (Repealed by Statute Law Revision (Ireland) Act 1878 (41 & 42 Vict. c. 57))
Shipwrecked Goods Preservation Act 1717 (repealed)	4 Geo. 1. c. 4 (I)	20 November 1717
An Act for the preserving of all such ships and goods thereof, which shall happen to be forced on shore, or stranded upon the coasts of this kingdom. (Repealed by Wreck and Salvage Act 1846 (9 & 10 Vict. c. 99))
Distress for Rent Act 1717^{(Republic of Ireland)}	4 Geo. 1. c. 5 (I)	20 November 1717
An Act to explain and amend an act, intituled, "An Act for the more effectual preventing of frauds committed by tenants." (Note: Distress for Rent Act 1712 (11 Anne c. 2 (I)))
British Linen Import, Cordage Duty, and Linen Manufacture Act 1717	4 Geo. 1. c. 6 (I)	19 December 1717
An act for exempting British linen imported from all duties; and granting to his Majesty an additional duty on cordage, and for the more effectual preventing frauds and abuses in the hempen and flaxen manufactures of this kingdom, and for the further incouragement thereof.
Barracks and Lighthouses Act 1717	4 Geo. 1. c. 7 (I)	19 December 1717
An Act for vesting in his Majesty, his heirs and successors, the several lands, tenements, and hereditaments, whereon the barracks in this kingdom are built, or building or contracted for, and whereon light-houses are or shall be built; and for making reasonable satisfaction to the several owners and proprietors for the same; and likewise for amending an act made in the sixth year of her late Majesty's reign, intituled, "An Act to prevent the disorders that may happen by the marching of soldiers, and for providing carriages for the baggage of soldiers in their march." (Note: Marching Soldiers Act 1707 (6 Anne c. 14 (I))) (Repealed for the Republic of Ireland by Statute Law Revision (Pre-Union Irish Statutes) Act 1962 (No. 29))
Officers' Fees Return Act 1717 (repealed)	4 Geo. 1. c. 8 (I)	19 December 1717
An Act to oblige all Officers to return a List of their Fees by a Day certain. (Repealed for the Republic of Ireland by Statute Law Revision (Pre-Union Irish Statutes) Act 1962 (No. 29) and for Northern Ireland by the Statute Law Revision Act 1950 (14 Geo. 6. c. 6))
Temporary Laws Continuance Act 1717	4 Geo. 1. c. 9 (I)	19 December 1717
An Act for reviving, continuing, and amending several statutes made in this Kingdom heretofore temporary.
Fines and Recoveries Writs of Error Act 1717 (repealed)	4 Geo. 1. c. 10 (I)	19 December 1717
An Act for limiting certain times within which writs of error shall be brought for the reversing fines and common recoveries. (Repealed by Statute Law Revision (Ireland) Act 1878 (41 & 42 Vict. c. 57))
Dublin Improvement Act 1717 (repealed)	4 Geo. 1. c. 11 (I)	16 December 1717
An Act for the better amendment of the pavements, and more effectual cleansing the streets of the city of Dublin, and for removing encroachments and nuisances, that are or shall be erected therein; and preventing mischiefs occasions by drivers of carts, drays, or cars riding thereon, and for regulating the selling of hay in the city of Dublin and liberties thereunto adjoining. (Repealed by Statute Law Revision (Ireland) Act 1878 (41 & 42 Vict. c. 57))
Packing of Butter Act 1717	4 Geo. 1. c. 12 (I)	19 December 1717
An Act for repealing part of a clause in an act made in the second year of his Majesty's reign, (Note: Packing of Tallow Act 1715 (2 Geo. 1. c. 16 (I))) by which the dimensions of butter casks are ascertained, and for explaining and further amending the law in relation to butter casks.
Frivolous Suits Act 1717 (repealed)	4 Geo. 1. c. 13 (I)	19 December 1717
An Act for explaining and amending an Act of Parliament made in the ninth year of his late Majesty King William, intitled, "An Act for the preventing frivolous and vexatious Law Suits; and giving Remedy to the Parties grieved to recover their Costs at Law in certain Cases, where heretofore no Costs were given." (Note: Frivolous Suits Act 1697 (9 Will. 3. c. 10 (I))) (Repealed for the Republic of Ireland by Statute Law Revision (Pre-Union Irish Statutes) Act 1962 (No. 29) and for Northern Ireland by the Statute Law Revision Act 1950 (14 Geo. 6. c. 6))
Tuam Diocese Clergy and Cork Foundation Act 1717	4 Geo. 1. c. 14 (I)	19 December 1717
An Act for settling the quarter parts upon the parochial clergy of the diocese of Tuam; and for empowering the lord archbishop of Tuam to set leases of part of his demesne lands; as also for confirming a charitable foundation in the city of Cork.
Galway Regulation and Protestant Interest Act 1717	4 Geo. 1. c. 15 (I)	19 December 1717
An Act for the better regulating the Town of Galway, and for the strengthening the Protestant Interest therein.
Kilkenny Corporation and Protestant Interest Act 1717	4 Geo. 1. c. 16 (I)	
An Act for the better regulating the Corporation of the City of Kilkenny, and strengthening the Protestant Interest therein, and punishing Aldermen Robert Connell, for withdrawing himself with the Books and Papers belonging to the said Corporation.

=== Private acts ===
Short title, or popular name	Citation	Royal assent
Long title
Smith's Estate Act 1717	4 Geo. 1. c. 1 Pr. (I)	19 December 1717
An Act for sale of a moiety of the lands of Duray, and of the other lands in the half barony of Ross, and county of Galway, part of the estate of William Smith, esquire, for the payment of £800 chargeable thereon, and for purchasing other lands to be settled to the same uses.
Edwards' Estate Act 1717	4 Geo. 1. c. 2 Pr. (I)	19 December 1717
An Act to enable Richard Edwards and John Edwards, esquires, to charge the sum of £1,500 on part of the estate of the said Richard Edwards, and for raising portions for the younger children of the said John Edwards and for other uses mentioned in the said act, and for settling a jointure on Jane, the wife of the said John Edwards.

- "Pre-Union Irish Statutes: 1717 Acts". Irish Statute Book. Attorney General of Ireland.

== 6 Geo. 1 (1719) ==
The 3rd session of the parliament of George I, which met from 26 June 1719 until 2 November 1719.

This session was also traditionally cited as 6 G. 1.

=== Public acts ===
Short title, or popular name	Citation	Royal assent
Long title
Michaelmas Term Act 1719 (repealed)	6 Geo. 1. c. 1 (I)	12 October 1719
An Act for abbreviating Michaelmas-term, and settling the commencement thereof. (Repealed by Statute Law Revision (Ireland) Act 1878 (41 & 42 Vict. c. 57))
Coals Engrossing and Regrating Act 1719	6 Geo. 1. c. 2 (I)	12 October 1719
An Act for the more effectual preventing the ingrossing and regrating of coals in this kingdom.
Militia Act 1719 (repealed)	6 Geo. 1. c. 3 (I)	12 October 1719
An Act for continuing and amending an Act, intituled, "An Act to make the Militia of this Kingdom more useful." (Note: Militia Act (Ireland) 1715 (2 Geo. 1. c. 9 (I))) (Repealed by Statute Law Revision (Ireland) Act 1878 (41 & 42 Vict. c. 57))
Import Duties, Pensions Tax, and Loan Act 1719 (repealed)	6 Geo. 1. c. 4 (I)	2 November 1719
An Act for continuing to his Majesty an additional duties on beer, ale, strong waters, tobacco, and other goods and merchandizes; and also on all sorts of wine, strong waters, and spirits perfectly made, and upon all spirits made and distilled of wine; and also a tax on all salaries, profits of imployments, fees, and pensions therein mentioned; and for continuing the further additional duty on ale, beer, and strong waters, and spirits perfectly made, and upon all spirits made and distilled of wine; and for granting an additional duty on molasses, treacle, tea, coffee, chocolate, and cocoa-nuts; and for securing the re-payment of fifty thousand pounds sterling, formerly advanced unto his Majesty for the use of the publick, together with the interest thereof. (Repealed by Statute Law Revision (Ireland) Act 1878 (41 & 42 Vict. c. 57))
Toleration Act 1719 or the Prohibition of Disturbance of Worship Act 1719	6 Geo. 1. c. 5 (I)	2 November 1719
An Act for exempting the protestant dissenters of this kingdom from certain penalties, to which they are now subject.
Writs of Error and Law Amendment Act 1719	6 Geo. 1. c. 6 (I)	2 November 1719
An Act to prevent Delays in Writs of Error, and for the further Amendments of the Law.
Yarn, Cloth, and Linen Manufactures Act 1719	6 Geo. 1. c. 7 (I)	2 November 1719
An Act for the better regulating the buying and selling of yarn and cloth, and further improving the hempen and flaxen manufacturers of this kingdom.
Smuggling Act 1719	6 Geo. 1. c. 8 (I)	2 November 1719
An Act for the more effectual preventing the running of goods, and for the further preventing frauds committed in his Majesty's customs.
Oaths of Qualification (Indemnity) Act 1719 (repealed)	6 Geo. 1. c. 9 (I)	2 November 1719
An Act for quieting and discharging all persons in officers or employments from the penalties they may have incurred, by not qualifying themselves pursuant to the act (Note: Popery Act 1703 (2 Anne c. 6 (I))) to prevent the further growth of popery; and for limitting the time for prosecutions on the said act. (Repealed by Promissory Oaths Act 1871 (34 & 35 Vict. c. 48))
Parish Watches, Highways, and Public Money Act 1719 (repealed)	6 Geo. 1. c. 10 (I)	2 November 1719
An Act for the better regulating the Parish Watches, and amending the High Ways in this Kingdom, and for the preventing the Misapplication of Publick Money. (Repealed by Statute Law Revision (Ireland) Act 1878 (41 & 42 Vict. c. 57))
Benefices Act 1719 (repealed)	6 Geo. 1. c. 11 (I)	2 November 1719
An Act for better securing the rights of advowson and presentation to ecclesiastical benefices. (Repealed by Statute Law Revision (Ireland) Act 1878 (41 & 42 Vict. c. 57))
Felons Apprehension and Transportation Act 1719 (repealed)	6 Geo. 1. c. 12 (I)	2 November 1719
An Act for the better and more effectual apprehending and transporting felons and others, and for continuing and amending several laws made in this kingdom for suppressing tories, robbers, and rapparees. (Repealed by Statute Law Revision (Ireland) Act 1878 (41 & 42 Vict. c. 57))
Maintenance of Curates Act 1719 (repealed)	6 Geo. 1. c. 13 (I)	2 November 1719
An Act for the better maintenance of curates within the church of Ireland. (Repealed by Statute Law Revision (Ireland) Act 1878 (41 & 42 Vict. c. 57))
Impropriations and Tythes Restitution Act 1719 (repealed)	6 Geo. 1. c. 14 (I)	2 November 1719
An Act for amending and enforcing a clause contained in an act (Note: Impropriations and Tythes Restitution Act 1634 (10 & 11 Chas. 1. c. 2 (I))) to enable restitution of impropriations and tithes, and other rights ecclesiastical, to the clergy, with a restraint of aliening the same, and direction for presentation to the churches. (Repealed by Statute Law Revision (Ireland) Act 1878 (41 & 42 Vict. c. 57))
County Pavements, Dublin Fire Prevention, and Hackney Coaches Act 1719	6 Geo. 1. c. 15 (I)	2 November 1719
An Act for the more effectual amendment of the pavements of the several counties of cities and counties of towns in this kingdom; and for preventing mischiefs that may happen by fire in the city of Dublin; and for augmenting the number of hackney-coaches and chairs in the said city.
River Dodder Act 1719	6 Geo. 1. c. 16 (I)	2 November 1719
An Act for cleansing and repairing the water-course leading from the river Dodeer to the city of Dublin, and to prevent the diverting and corrupting the waters therein.
Relief of Insolvent Debtors Act 1719 (repealed)	6 Geo. 1. c. 17 (I)	2 November 1719
An Act for the relief of insolvent debtors. (Repealed by Statute Law Revision (Ireland) Act 1878 (41 & 42 Vict. c. 57))
Dublin, Cork, and Limerick Street Lights Act 1719 (repealed)	6 Geo. 1. c. 18 (I)	2 November 1719
An Act for erecting and continuing lights in the city of Dublin, and the several liberties adjoining, and also in the cities of Cork and Limerick, and liberties thereof. (Repealed by Statute Law Revision (Ireland) Act 1878 (41 & 42 Vict. c. 57))

=== Private acts ===
Short title, or popular name	Citation	Royal assent
Long title
Eustace's Estate Act 1719	6 Geo. 1. c. 1 Pr. (I)	2 November 1719
An Act for sale of the estate of Sir Maurice Eustace, knight, deceased, for the payment of his debts.
Earl of Ross's Creditors Act 1719	6 Geo. 1. c. 2 Pr. (I)	2 November 1719
An Act for the more speedy paying the creditors of Richard, earl of Ross.
Bingham's Estate Act 1719	6 Geo. 1. c. 3 Pr. (I)	2 November 1719
An Act to enable John Bingham, esquire, to settle a competent jointure on such wife as he shall marry, and to charge his estate with portions for his younger children.
Plunkett's Estate Act 1719	6 Geo. 1. c. 4 Pr. (I)	2 November 1719
An Act for confirming an agreement made between Nicholas Plunkett and Henry Plunkett, his brother, and exchanging their estates, and for securing to several Protestant legatees the legacies to them bequeathed by the last will of Nicholas Plunkett, esquire, deceased.
Miller's Estate Act 1719	6 Geo. 1. c. 5 Pr. (I)	2 November 1719
An Act for sale of part of the estate of Robert Miller of Millford in County Mayo, esquire, for payment of his debts.
Brasier's Estate Act 1719	6 Geo. 1. c. 6 Pr. (I)	2 November 1719
An Act for vesting certain lands in the county of Donegal, part of the estate of the Honourable Kilner Brasier, esquire, in certain trustees for payment of his debts, and for settling other lands in the county of the city of Limerick, of a greater value, to the same uses.
Byrne's Estate Act 1719	6 Geo. 1. c. 7 Pr. (I)	2 November 1719
An Act for vesting the lands of Coolbanagher alias Coolbanacree alias Colebanagher, Kilgenny, Ballyraghan, Ballynabegg, Glanballyfin and Shanebegg, and the woods thereon, lying and being in the Queen's County in Sir John Byrne, baronet, a minor, and his heirs, subject to the sum of £2,500 to be raised by mortgage of the lands, or a competent part thereof, or by the sale of the said woods, to be paid to the heirs, executors, administrators or representatives of Charles Wilcocks, Joshua Wilcocks and Thomas Wilcocks, deceased, respectively.
Morgan's Estate Act 1719	6 Geo. 1. c. 8 Pr. (I)	2 November 1719
An Act to enable Charles Morgan, junior, of Kilcolgan in the county of Galway, esquire, to sell or mortgage part of his estate for the payment of his debts.
Christ Church Cork Act 1719	6 Geo. 1. c. 9 Pr. (I)	2 November 1719
An Act for rebuilding the parish church of Christ Church in the city of Cork.

=== Sources ===
- "Acts of Parliament by Session: 1719". Irish Legislation Database. Queen's University Belfast.
- "Pre-Union Irish Statutes: 1719 Acts". Irish Statute Book. Attorney General of Ireland.

== See also ==
- List of acts of the Parliament of Ireland
- List of acts of the Oireachtas
- List of legislation in the United Kingdom
