= Irish Statute Book =

Irish legal website/database

- Website: www.irishstatutebook.ie

The Irish Statute Book, also known as the electronic Irish Statute Book (eISB), is a database produced by the Office of the Attorney General of Ireland. It contains copies of Acts of the Oireachtas and statutory instruments. It also contains a Legislation Directory which includes chronological tables of pre-1922 legislation. It is published on a website (irishstatutebook.ie) and was formerly published on CD-ROM.

In 2001, the Irish Law Times said that, whilst the Attorney General's staff deserved to be congratulated for the Irish Statute Book, the CD-ROM version contained a "significant number of errors".

== See also ==
- Law of the Republic of Ireland
