= Civil Bill Courts (Ireland) Act 1851 =

Act of the Parliament of the United Kingdom

Civil Bill Courts (Ireland) Act 1851 (Note: The citation of this act by this short title was authorised by section 1 of, and the first schedule to, the Short Titles Act 1896. Due to the repeal of those provisions it is now authorised by section 19(2) of the Interpretation Act 1978.)
- Act of Parliament
- Parliament of the United Kingdom
- Long title: An Act to consolidate and amend the Laws relating to Civil Bills and the Courts of Quarter Sessions in Ireland, and to transfer to the Assistant Barristers certain Jurisdiction as to Insolvent Debtors.
- Citation: 14 & 15 Vict. c. 57
- Territorial extent: Ireland (Note: Section 165.)

Dates
- Royal assent: 1 August 1851
- Commencement: 31 August 1851 (Note: Section 164.)
- Repealed: 1 February 1966 (Note: The County Court Appeals Act 1964 Date of Commencement Order (Northern Ireland) 1966.)
Other legislation
Amends	See § Repealed enactments
Repeals/revokes	See § Repealed enactments
Amended by	Irish Bankrupt and Insolvent Act 1857; Chairman of Quarter Sessions (Ireland) Act 1858; Landlord and Tenant Law Amendment (Ireland) Act 1860; Statute Law Revision Act 1875; Statute Law Revision Act 1878
Repealed by	County Courts Act (Northern Ireland) 1955; County Courts Act (Northern Ireland) 1959; County Courts Appeals Act (Northern Ireland) 1964

Status: Repealed

Text of statute as originally enacted

The Civil Bill Courts (Ireland) Act 1851 (14 & 15 Vict. c. 57) was an act of the Parliament of the United Kingdom that consolidated enactments related to civil bills and the courts of quarter sessions in Ireland.

== Provisions ==
=== Repealed enactments ===
Section 1 of the act repealed 31 enactments, listed in schedule (A.) to the act.

Citation	Short title	Description	Extent of repeal
9 Will. 3. c. 15 (I)	Small Debts Recovery Act 1697	For the more easy and speedy securing and Recovery of Small Debts.	The whole act.
2 Geo. 1. c. 11 (I)	Small Debts Recovery Act 1715	For reviving and amending an Act, entitled "An Act for Recovery of Small Debts in a summary Way before the Judges of Assize."	The whole of this Act, except that Part of same which relates to the Amount of Costs in Actions of Trespass and Actions for Battery and Actions for Assault and Slander, where Damages under 40s. viz. Sections 16 and 17.
8 Geo. 1. c. 6 (I)	Law Amendment and Expiring Acts Act 1721	For the further Amendment of the Law; and for continuing and amending several Acts nearly expiring.	Section 4 of this Act.
1 Geo. 2. c. 14 (I)	Small Debts Recovery Act 1727	For explaining and amending an Act, entitled "An Act for reviving and amending an Act, entitled 'An Act for Recovery of Small Debts in a summary Way before the Judges of Assize.'"	The whole act.
31 Geo. 2. c. 16 (I)	Dublin Small Debts Recovery Act 1757	For the Recovery of Small Debts in a summary Way in the City of Dublin and the Liberties thereof.	The whole act.
7 Geo. 3. c. 21 (I)	Tithes Act 1767	To continue and amend an Act passed in the Third Year of His Majesty's Reign, entitled "An Act to amend and explain an Act made in the Thirty-third Year of the Reign of Henry the Eighth, entitled 'An Act for Tythes;'" and for other Purposes therein mentioned.	Sections 6, 7, 8, and 9.
19 & 20 Geo. 3. c. 26 (I)	Small Debts (Dublin) Act 1779	For amending the Acts of the Second and Eighth Years of the Reign of His late Majesty King George the First, and of the First Year of His late Majesty King George the Second, for Recovery of Small Debts, in a summary Way, by Civil Bill, as far as they relate to the County of Dublin.	The whole act.
27 Geo. 3. c. 40 (I)	Peace Preservation Act 1787	For the better Execution of the Law and Preservation of the Peace within Counties at large.	So much of said Act as relates to the appointing of Sessions; also the Appointment of Towns for holding Sessions; the Appointment of Assistant Barristers, and their Salary, and the Duties of same. Sections 14, 15, 16.
31 Geo. 3. c. 31 (I)	Civil Bills Decrees Act 1791	For the preventing of Frauds in the Execution of Decrees obtained on Civil Bills.	The whole act.
36 Geo. 3. c. 25 (I)	Civil Bill Courts Act 1796	For the better and more convenient Administration of Justice, and for the Recovery of Small Debts, in a summary Way, at the Sessions of the Peace of the several Counties at large within this Kingdom, except the County of Dublin, and for continuing and amending an Act, entitled "An Act for the better Execution of the Law and Preservation of the Peace within Counties at large."	The whole act.
38 Geo. 3. c. 25 (I)	Civil Bill Courts Act 1798	To amend an Act passed in the Thirty-sixth Year of the Reign of His Majesty King George the Third, entitled "An Act for the better and more convenient Administration of Justice, and for the Recovery of Small Debts in a summary Way, at the Sessions of the Peace of the several Counties at large within this Kingdom, except the County of Dublin," and for continuing and amending an Act, entitled "An Act for the better Execution of the Law and Preservation of the Peace within Counties at large," save and except Section 2, and so much of Section 6 as relates to the Barony of Ballinacor.	The whole act.
38 Geo. 3. c. 65 (I)	Chairman of Quarter Sessions in Dublin Act 1798	Appointing Chairman of the Sessions of the Peace in the County of Dublin.	The whole act, to be repealed from and after the Death, Resignation, or Removal of the present Chairman.
39 Geo. 3. c. 16 (I)	Civil Bill Courts Act 1799	For the further Amendment of an Act passed in the Thirty-sixth Year of the Reign of His Majesty King George the Third, entitled "An Act for the better and more convenient Administration of Justice, and for the Recovery of Small Debts in a summary Way, at the Sessions of the Peace of the several Counties at large within this Kingdom, except the County of Dublin, and for continuing and amending an Act, entitled 'An Act for the better Execution of the Law and Preservation of the Peace within Counties at large.'"	The whole act.
40 Geo. 3. c. 69	Judicial Salaries and Pensions Act (Ireland) 1800	To enable His Majesty to grant Annuities to the Chairman of the Quarter Sessions of the County of Dublin, and Assistant Barristers of the several other Counties on the Resignation of their respective Offices.	So much of said Act as relates to the retiring Pensions of the Chairman of Kilmainham, and the Assistant Barristers in Ireland, save as to any retiring Pensions heretofore granted to any such Persons now living. Sections 1, 5.
49 Geo. 3. c. 101	Criminal Prosecutions Fees (Ireland) Act 1809	To regulate the Fees payable by Persons charged with Treason, Felony, and all other Offences at Assizes and Quarter Sessions in Ireland; and for amending an Act of the Parliament of Ireland made in the Thirty-sixth Year of His present Majesty relating thereto.	So much thereof as relates to the Division of Counties. Section 5.
54 Geo. 3. c. 68	Ecclesiastical Proctors (Ireland) Act 1814	For the better Regulation of Ecclesiastical Courts in Ireland; and for the more easy Recovery of Church Rates and Tithes.	So much of said Act as relates to Proceedings for Recovery of Monies under Monitions before Chairman of the County of Dublin and Assistant Barristers.
54 Geo. 3. c. 131	Appointment of Superintending Magistrates, etc. Act 1814	To provide for the better Execution of the Laws in Ireland, by appointing Superintending Magistrates and additional Constables in Counties in certain Cases.	Section 8.
54 Geo. 3. c. 181	Assaults (Ireland) Act 1814	To render more easy and effectual Redress for Assaults in Ireland.	So much of said Act as relates to the Division of Counties into Districts for Civil Bill Courts. Section 20.
56 Geo. 3. c. 88	Recovery of Tenements, etc. (Ireland) Act 1816	To amend the Law of Ireland respecting the Recovery of Tenements from absconding, overholding, and defaulting Tenants, and for the Protection of the Tenant from undue Distress.	The whole act, save Section 14.
58 Geo. 3. c. 39	Recovery of Tenements, etc. (Ireland) Act 1818	To explain and amend an Act passed in the Fifty-sixth Year of the Reign of His present Majesty, for amending the Law of Ireland respecting the Recovery of Tenements from absconding, overholding, and defaulting Tenants; and for the Protection of the Tenant from undue Distress.	The whole act.
1 Geo. 4. c. 41	Recovery of Tenements (Ireland) Act 1820	To extend the Benefit of Two Acts made in the Fifty-sixth and Fifty-eighth Years of the Reign of His late Majesty King George the Third, for amending the Law of Ireland respecting the Recovery of Tenements from absconding, overholding, and defaulting Tenants.	The whole act, except Section 2.
4 Geo. 4. c. 93	Division of County of Cork Act 1823	To divide the County of Cork, for the Purpose of holding additional General Sessions therein.	The whole act.
7 Geo. 4. c. 36	Civil Bill Courts (Ireland) Act 1826	To regulate the Service of the Process of the several Courts for the Recovery of Small Debts by Civil Bill in Ireland.	The whole act.
1 & 2 Will. 4. c. 31	Judicature (Ireland) Act 1831	To improve the Administration of Justice in Ireland.	So much of said Act as relates to the Times for holding Quarter Sessions and the Time for fixing same. Sections 9, 11.
6 & 7 Will. 4. c. 75	Civil Bill Courts (Ireland) Act 1836	To extend the Jurisdiction and regulate the Proceedings of the Civil Bill Courts in Ireland.	The whole act.
7 Will. 4 & 1 Vict. c. 43	Small Debts' Recovery (Ireland) Act 1837	To amend the Laws for the Recovery of Small Debts by Civil Bill in Ireland.	The whole act.
5 & 6 Vict. c. 33	Civil Bill Decrees (Ireland) Act 1842	An Act to amend and explain so much of Two Acts of the Sixth and Seventh Years of His late Majesty, and of the First Year of Her present Majesty, as relates to the Execution of Civil Bill Decrees for the Possession of Land in Ireland.	The whole act.
6 & 7 Vict. c. 81	Session of the Peace, Dublin Act 1843	An Act to make better Provision for the Appointment of a Deputy for the Chairman for the Sessions of the Peace for the County of Dublin, and to provide for the taking of an Oath by the said Chairman or Deputy; and to amend an Act of the First Year of Her present Majesty to amend the Law for the Recovery of Small Debts by Civil Bill in Ireland.	The whole act.
9 & 10 Vict. c. 111	Ejectment and Distress (Ireland) Act 1846	An Act to amend the Law in Ireland as to Ejectments and Distresses, and as to the Occupation of Land.	So much of said Act as relates to Proceedings by Civil Bill, but so, nevertheless, that the 8th and the 10th Sections of the said Act shall not be hereby affected or repealed.
11 & 12 Vict. c. 28	Execution (Ireland) Act 1848	An Act to amend the Law of Imprisonment for Debt in Ireland, and to improve the Remedies for the Recovery of Debts and of the Possession of Tenements situate in Cities and Towns in certain Cases.	So much of the said Act as relates to any Civil Bill Court, or to any Action, Civil Bill, or Decree, Process, Evidence, Execution, or Proceeding in or relating to any such Civil Bill Court, save in so far as the said Act limits the Power of Arrest for all Sums not exceeding Ten Pounds; save also in so far as the said Act exempts from its Operation Proceedings relating to Revenue of Excise, or Customs, Stamps, Taxes, or Post Office.
11 & 12 Vict. c. 34	Appeals on Civil Bills, Dublin Act 1848	An Act to amend certain Acts in force in Ireland in relation to Appeals from Decrees and Dismisses on Civil Bills in the County of Dublin and County of the City of Dublin.	The whole act.

== Subsequent developments ==
Section 119 was repealed by section 2 of, and schedule (A.) to, the Irish Bankrupt and Insolvent Act 1857 (20 & 21 Vict. c. 60), which came into force on 1 November 1857.

Sections 71– 81, 83–88, 92–96, "so far as they relate to Proceedings between Landlord and Tenant, and to Persons in occupation who shall have signed Acknowledgments pursuant to the Act", were repealed by section 104 of, and schedule (B.) to, the Landlord and Tenant Law Amendment (Ireland) Act 1860 (23 & 24 Vict. c. 154), which came into force on 1 January 1861.

The act was progressively repealed by three acts of the Parliament of Northern Ireland: the County Courts Act (Northern Ireland) 1955, the County Courts Act (Northern Ireland) 1959, which came into force on 31 December 1959, and the County Courts Appeals Act (Northern Ireland) 1964, which came into force on 1 February 1966.
