= Landlord and Tenant Law Amendment (Ireland) Act 1860 =

Act of the Parliament of the United Kingdom

Landlord and Tenant Law Amendment (Ireland) Act 1860 (Note: Section 2.)
- Act of Parliament
- Parliament of the United Kingdom
- Long title: An Act to consolidate and amend the Law of Landlord and Tenant in Ireland.
- Citation: 23 & 24 Vict. c. 154
- Territorial extent: United Kingdom

Dates
- Royal assent: 28 August 1860
- Commencement: 1 January 1861 (Note: Section 105.)
Other legislation
| Amends | See § Repealed enactments |
| Repeals/revokes | See § Repealed enactments |
| Amended by | Statute Law Revision Act 1875 |
| Relates to | Civil Bill Courts (Ireland) Act 1851 |

Status: Amended

Text of statute as originally enacted

The Landlord and Tenant Law Amendment Act Ireland 1860 (23 & 24 Vict. c. 154), better known as Deasy's Act, is an act of the Parliament of the United Kingdom preceding the agrarian unrest in Ireland in the 1880s, the "Land War".

The act was named after its promoter Rickard Deasy, the Attorney-General for Ireland in the Liberal Party government of Lord Palmerston.

The act amended the Landlord and Tenant (Ireland) Act 1826 (7 Geo. 4. c. 29). The 1860 act was itself amended by the Irish Land Acts.

The act made contract law the basis for tenancies and abolished any feudal rents paid by services to a landlord, or by payments in kind.

== Provisions ==
=== Section 4 ===
Section 4 remains the most important part of the act still in force. It provides that all leases of over twelve months must be evidenced in writing in order to be enforced.

=== Repealed enactments ===
Section 104 of the act repealed 39 enactments, listed in schedule (B.) to the act.

| Citation | Short title | Description | Extent of repeal |
Acts of the Parliament of Ireland
| 15 Edw. 4. c. 1 (I) | N/A | An Act passed in Session of the Parliament of Ireland holden in the Fifteenth Year of the Reign of King Edward the Fourth, Chapter One, intituled An Act prohibiting Distresses to be taken contrary to the Common Law. | The whole act. (Note: The act was already repealed by Criminal Statutes (Ireland) Repeal Act 1828 (9 Geo. 4. c. 53).) |
| 18 Edw. 4. c. 1 (I) | Distress for Rent Act 1478 | An Act whereby Distresses taken for Rent may be sold. | The whole act. |
| 33 Hen. 8 Sess. 1. c. 7 (I) | Distraint (Lords and Lands) Act 1541 | An Act for all Lords to distraine upon the Lands of them holden, and to make their Avowrie, not naming the Tenant but the Land. | The whole act. |
| 33 Hen. 8 Sess. 1. c. 13 (I) | Lessees and Recoveries Act 1541 | An Act for Attournements. | The entire Act so far as it relates to Distress for Rent. |
| 10 Chas. 1. Sess. 2. c. 4 (I) | Grantees of Reversions Act 1634 | An Act concerning Grantees of Reversions to take advantage of Breaches of Condition, &c. | The whole act. |
| 10 Chas. 1. Sess. 2. c. 5 (I) | Rent Arrears Recovery Act 1634 | An Act for Recovery of Arrears of Rents by Executors of Tenant in Fee Simple. | The whole act. |
| 10 & 11 Chas. 1. c. 7 (I) | Distress for Rent Act 1634 | An Act of Explanation of a Statute made in this Realm in the Eighteenth Year of the Reign of the late King Edward the Fourth, intituled "An Act whereby Distresses taken for Rent may be sold." | The whole act. |
| 7 Will. 3. c. 12 (I) | Statute of Frauds 1695 | An Act for Prevention of Frauds and Perjuries. | Sec. 1. |
| 11 Anne c. 2 (I) | Distress for Rent Act 1712 | An Act for the more effectual preventing of Frauds committed by Tenants. | The entire Act, except Sec. 7; Sec. 8 being already repealed. |
| 4 Geo. 1. c. 5 (I) | Distress for Rent Act 1717 | An Act to explain and amend an Act, intituled "An Act for the more effectual preventing of Frauds committed by Tenants." | The entire Act except Sec. 1. |
| 8 Geo. 1. c. 2 (I) | Distress for Rent Act 1721 | An Act for amending an Act, intituled "An Act to explain and amend an Act intituled 'An Act for the more effectual preventing of Frauds committed by Tenants.'" | The entire Act except Secs. 8, 9, 10. |
| 10 Geo. 1. c. 5 (I) | Mining Leases Act 1723 | An Act for the further Encouragement of finding and working Mines and Minerals within this Kingdom. | Secs. 4, 5, 6, and 7. |
| 5 Geo. 2. c. 4 (I) | Security of Trade Act 1731 | An Act for the further explaining and amending the several Laws for preventing Frauds committed by Tenants, and for the more easy Renewal of Leases, and for the further Amendment of the Law in certain Cases therein mentioned. | Secs. 1, 2, 3, and 4. |
| 11 Geo. 2. c. 5 (I) | Privilege of Parliament Act 1737 | An Act to explain and amend an Act intituled "An Act for preventing Inconveniences that may happen by Privilege of Parliament." | Sec. 3. |
| 11 Geo. 2. c. 19 (Note: Incorrectly cited as "51 Geo. 2. Cap. 8".) | Distress for Rent Act 1737 | An Act for the more effectual securing the Payment of Rents, and preventing Frauds by Tenants. | Sec. 9. |
| 17 Geo. 2. c. 10 (I) | Burning of Land Act 1743 | An Act to prevent the pernicious Practice of burning Land, and for the more effectual destroying of Vermin. | The whole act. |
| 25 Geo. 2. c. 13 (I) | Distress for Rent Act 1751 | An Act for explaining, amending, and making more effectual the Laws relating to Landlord and Tenant. | Secs. 1, 2, and 3. |
| 1 Geo. 3. c. 17 (I) | Municipal Corporations Act 1761 | An Act for reviving, continuing, and amending several temporary Statutes, and for other Purposes therein mentioned. | Secs. 2, 3, 4, and 5. |
| 3 Geo. 3. c. 29 (I) | Burning of Land Act 1763 | An Act for the more effectual preventing the pernicious Practice of burning Land. | The whole act. |
| 5 Geo. 3. c. 10 (I) | Burning of Land Act 1765 | An Act for the more effectually carrying into execution the Laws heretofore made to prevent the pernicious Practice of burning Land. | The whole act. |
| 15 & 16 Geo. 3. c. 27 (I) | Prevention of Frauds by Tenants Act 1775 | An Act to amend the several Acts of Parliament made in this Kingdom for the more effectual preventing of Frauds by Tenants. | The whole act. |
| 23 & 24 Geo. 3. c. 46 (I) | Landlord and Tenant Act 1783 | An Act for the Apportionment and more easy Recovery of Rents in certain Cases. | The whole act. |
| 31 Geo. 3. c. 40 (I) | Landlord and Tenant Act 1791 | An Act for the Preservation of Shrubs and Trees. | The whole act. |
| 40 Geo. 3. c. 24 (I) | Burning of Land Act 1800 | An Act for more effectually preventing the burning of Land. | The whole act. |
Statutes of the Parliament of the United Kingdom of Great Britain and Ireland
| 46 Geo. 3. c. 71 | Mines (Ireland) Act 1806 | An Act to amend several Acts for the Encouragement of finding and working Mines and Minerals within Ireland. | Secs. 2 and 3. |
| 54 Geo. 3. c. 115 | Burning of Land (Ireland) Act 1814 | An Act to amend an Act of the Parliament of Ireland for preventing the pernicious Practice of burning Land, and for the more effectual destroying of Vermin. | The whole act. (Note: This act was repealed again for the avoidance of doubt by the Statute Law Revision Act 1873 (36 & 37 Vict. c. 91).) |
| 56 Geo. 3. c. 88 | Recovery of Tenements, etc. (Ireland) Act 1816 | An Act to amend the Law of Ireland respecting the Recovery of Tenements from absconding, overholding, and defaulting Tenants, and for the Protection of the Tenant from undue Distress. | Sec. 14, being the Residue of the Act unrepealed. |
| 1 Geo. 4. c. 41 | Recovery of Tenements (Ireland) Act 1820 | An Act to extend the Benefit of Two Acts made in the Fifty-sixth and Fifty-eighth Years of the Reign of His late Majesty King George the Third, for amending the Law of Ireland respecting the Recovery of Tenements from absconding, overholding, and defaulting Tenants. | Sec. 2. |
| 1 Geo. 4. c. 87 | Recovery of Possession by Landlords Act 1820 | An Act for enabling Landlords more speedily to recover Possession of Lands and Tenements unlawfully held over by Tenants. | The entire Act, as regards Ireland. |
| 4 Geo. 4. c. 89 | Law Costs (Ireland) Act 1823 | An Act to limit and regulate the Expense of certain Proceedings in the Courts of Justice in Ireland in the Particulars therein mentioned. | Sec. 1. |
| 7 Geo. 4. c. 29 | Assignment and Sub-letting of Land (Ireland) Act 1826 | An Act to amend the Law of Ireland respecting the Assignment and sub-letting of Lands and Tenements. | The entire Act, except as to Leases, Instruments, and Agreements for Leases made between the 1st Day of June 1826 and the 1st Day of May 1832. |
| 7 & 8 Geo. 4. c. 67 | Petty Sessions (Ireland) Act 1827 | An Act for the better Administration of Justice at the holding of Petty Sessions by Justices of the Peace in Ireland. | Sec. 17. |
| 9 Geo. 4. c. 56 | Malicious Injuries to Property (Ireland) Act 1828 | An Act for consolidating and amending the Laws in Ireland relative to malicious Injuries to Property. | Secs. 25, 26, 27, 28, and 29. |
| 2 Will. 4. c. 17 | Assignment, etc., of Leases (Ireland) Act 1832 | An Act to repeal an Act passed in the Seventh Year of His late Majesty King George the Fourth, intituled "An Act to amend the Law of Ireland respecting the Assignment and sub-letting of Lands and Tenements," and to substitute other Provisions instead thereof. | The entire Act, except Sec. 1. |
| 4 & 5 Will. 4. c. 22 | Apportionment Act 1834 | An Act to amend an Act of the Eleventh Year of King George the Second, respecting the Apportionment of Rents, Annuities, and other periodical Payments. | Secs. 2 and 3. |
| 8 & 9 Vict. c. 106 | Real Property Act 1845 | An Act to amend the Law of Real Property. | Sec. 3, save so far as same relates to Feoffments, Partitions, and Exchanges. |
| 9 & 10 Vict. c. 111 | Ejectment and Distress (Ireland) Act 1846 | An Act to amend the Law in Ireland as to Ejectments and Distresses, and as to the Occupation of Lands. | Secs. 1, 2, 3, 4, 5, 6, 7, 8, and 9. |
| 14 & 15 Vict. c. 25 | Landlord and Tenant Act 1851 | An Act to improve the Law of Landlord and Tenant in relation to Emblements and growing Crops seized in Execution. | Sec. 1, so far as regards Ireland. |
| 14 & 15 Vict. c. 57 | Civil Bill Courts (Ireland) Act 1851 | An Act to consolidate and amend the Laws relating to Civil Bill and other Courts of Quarter Sessions in Ireland, and to transfer to the Assistant Barrister certain Jurisdiction as to Insolvent Debtors. | Secs. 71, 72, 73, 74, 75, 76, 77, 78, 80, 81, 83, 84, 85, 86, 87, 88, 92, 93, 94, 95, and 96, so far as they relate to Proceedings between Landlord and Tenant, and to Persons in occupation who shall have signed Acknowledgments pursuant to the Act. |

== Continuing effect ==
The Law Reform Commission in 2003 stated the act "continues as the foundation of the law of landlord and tenant in Ireland". In 2011 the Minister for Justice published a draft scheme of a bill to modernise landlord and tenant law, however the bill was never introduced to the Oireachtas.
