= Tithe Act 1936 =

Act of the Parliament of the United Kingdom

Tithe Act 1936 (Note: Section 48(1).)
- Act of Parliament
- Parliament of the United Kingdom
- Long title: An Act to extinguish tithe rentcharge and extraordinary tithe rentcharge, and to make provision with respect to the compensation of the owners thereof and rating authorities and to the liabilities of the owners of land charged therewith in respect of the extinguishment thereof; to reduce the rate at which tithe rentcharge is to be payable pending its extinguishment and to make provision with respect to the recovery of arrears thereof; to make provision for the redemption and extinguishment of corn rents and similar payments; and for purposes connected with the matters aforesaid.
- Citation: 26 Geo. 5 & 1 Edw. 8. c. 43
- Territorial extent: England and Wales (Note: Section 48(2).)

Dates
- Royal assent: 31 July 1936
- Commencement: 31 July 1936 (Note: The Acts of Parliament (Commencement) Act 1793.)

Other legislation
- Amends: See § Repealed enactments
- Repeals/revokes: See § Repealed enactments
- Amended by: Statute Law Revision Act 1950; Tithe Act 1951; Income Tax Act 1952; Statute Law Revision Act 1953; Finance Act 1958; Local Government Act 1958; Finance Act 1962; Local Government (Records) Act 1962; Finance Act 1963; Statute Law Revision Act 1963; Statute Law Revision Act 1964; Land Charges Act 1972; Statute Law (Repeals) Act 1975; Endowments and Glebe Measure 1976; Finance Act 1977; Finance Act 1989; Arbitration Act 1996; Statute Law (Repeals) Act 1998; Church of England (Miscellaneous Provisions) Measure 2000; Statute Law (Repeals) Act 2004

Status: Partially repealed

Text of statute as originally enacted

Revised text of statute as amended

Text of the Tithe Act 1936 as in force today (including any amendments) within the United Kingdom, from legislation.gov.uk.

The Tithe Act 1936 (26 Geo. 5 & 1 Edw. 8. c. 43) is an act of the Parliament of the United Kingdom that extinguished tithe rentcharge and extraordinary tithe rentcharge in England and Wales, compensated their owners with government stock, and charged the land formerly subject to them with redemption annuities payable to the Crown.

== Effect ==
Tithes were traditional crop-based liabilities on land, intended to support the church, but in many cases the right to benefit had transferred to a private recipient. The Tithe Commutation Act 1836 changed crop-based tithes into fixed money payments called "tithe rentcharges".

This act abolished those tithe rentcharges and replaced them with 60-year "tithe redemption annuities" paid to the government. These would have expired by 1996, but were abolished earlier on 2 October 1977 by section 56 of the Finance Act 1977 after one last double payment.

== Provisions ==
=== Repealed enactments ===
Section 48(3) of the act repealed 24 enactments, listed in the ninth schedule to the act.

Citation	Short title	Description	Extent of repeal
6 & 7 Will. 4. c. 71	Tithe Act 1836	The Tithe Act, 1836.	Sections fifty-seven, sixty-two, sixty-nine, seventy-seven, seventy-eight, eighty and eighty-six.
7 Will. 4 & 1 Vict. c. 69	Tithe Act 1837	The Tithe Act, 1837.	The whole act so far as unrepealed.
2 & 3 Vict. c. 62	Tithe Act 1839	The Tithe Act, 1839.	Sections fourteen, sixteen, seventeen, twenty-one and twenty-eight.
3 & 4 Vict. c. 15	Tithe Act 1840	The Tithe Act, 1840.	Sections seventeen, twenty and twenty-three.
5 & 6 Vict. c. 54	Tithe Act 1842	The Tithe Act, 1842.	Sections three, six, seven and eight.
14 & 15 Vict. c. 25	Landlord and Tenant Act 1851	The Landlord and Tenant Act, 1851.	Section four.
14 & 15 Vict. c. 50	Tithe Rating Act 1851	An Act to amend an Act of the Third and Fourth Years of King William the Fourth in respect of the Assessment of Tithe and Tithe Rentcharges for certain Rates.	In section one, the words " tithe rentcharges ".
14 & 15 Vict. c. 104	Episcopal and Capitular Estates Act 1851	The Episcopal and Capitular Estates Act, 1851.	In section eleven, the words " and tithe rentcharges ".
17 & 18 Vict. c. 116	Episcopal and Capitular Estates Act 1854	The Episcopal and Capitular Estates Act, 1854.	In section eight, the words " or tithe rentcharges " where they secondly occur.
23 & 24 Vict. c. 93	Tithe Act 1860	The Tithe Act, 1860.	Sections one, two, four to nine, thirty-one, forty-two and forty-three. The Schedule.
32 & 33 Vict. c. 67	Valuation (Metropolis) Act 1869	The Valuation (Metropolis) Act, 1869.	In section four, in the definition of " gross value ", the words " and tithe commutation rentcharge, if any ".
45 & 46 Vict. c. 37	Corn Returns Act 1882	The Corn Returns Act, 1882.	Section ten.
49 & 50 Vict. c. 54	Extraordinary Tithe Redemption Act 1886	The Extraordinary Tithe Redemption Act, 1886.	The whole act so far as unrepealed.
60 & 61 Vict. c. 23	Extraordinary Tithe Act 1897	The Extraordinary Tithe Act, 1897.	The whole act.
10 Edw. 7 & 1 Geo. 5. c. 24	Licensing (Consolidation) Act 1910	The Licensing (Consolidation) Act, 1910.	In section thirty-nine, in subsection (2), the words " and tithe commutation rentcharge (if any) ".
8 & 9 Geo. 5. c. 54	Tithe Act 1918	The Tithe Act, 1918.	Section ten. The First Schedule so far as unrepealed.
11 & 12 Geo. 5. c. 35	Corn Sales Act 1921	The Corn Sales Act, 1921.	In section two, in subsection (3), the words " and in section ten (which relates to the application of the septennial average to the Tithe Commutation Acts) ".
14 & 15 Geo. 5. c. 21	Finance Act 1924	The Finance Act, 1924.	In section twelve, in subsection (1) (b), the words " and tithe commutation rentcharge, if any ".
15 & 16 Geo. 5. c. 20	Law of Property Act 1925	The Law of Property Act, 1925.	In section one, in subsection (2) (d), the words " tithe rentcharge ". In section one hundred and ninety-one, in subsection (12), the words " tithe rentcharge or ". In section two hundred and one, in subsection (1), the words " tithe and ".
15 & 16 Geo. 5. c. 21	Land Registration Act 1925	The Land Registration Act, 1925.	In section seventy, in subsection (1) (e), the words " tithe rentcharge ".
15 & 16 Geo. 5. c. 87	Tithe Act 1925	The Tithe Act, 1925.	In section one, subsection (1). Section two. In section four, subsections (1), (2), (4) and (5). Sections six, nine and eleven. In section twelve, paragraphs (a) and (c). In section thirteen, subsections (2) and (4). Section seventeen. In section twenty, subsections (3) and (4).
15 & 16 Geo. 5. c. 90	Rating and Valuation Act 1925	The Rating and Valuation Act, 1925.	In section three, in subsection (2), the words " or tithe rentcharge " and the words " tithe rentcharge " where the last-mentioned words secondly occur. In section twenty-two, in subsection (1) (b), the words " and tithe rentcharge, if any ". In section sixty-eight, in subsection (1), in the definition of " gross value ", the words " and tithe rentcharge, if any ", and subsection (2).
19 & 20 Geo. 5. c. 17	Local Government Act 1929	The Local Government Act, 1929.	In the Third Schedule, in paragraph 2, the words " any tithe rentcharge or ", where they first occur, and the words " tithe rentcharge or ", where they secondly and thirdly occur.
20 & 21 Geo. 5. c. 24	Railways (Valuation for Rating) Act 1930	The Railways (Valuation for Rating) Act, 1930.	In section four, in subsection (1) (b) and subsection (3) (ii), the words " and tithe rentcharge (if any) ".

The repeals took effect from the appointed day, 2 October 1936, except as regards any tithe rentcharge not extinguished by the act.

== Subsequent developments ==
Section 48(3) of, and the ninth schedule to, the act were repealed by section 1(1) of, and the first schedule to, the Statute Law Revision Act 1950 (14 Geo. 6. c. 6), which came into force on 23 May 1950.

The Tithe Act 1951 (14 & 15 Geo. 6. c. 62) repealed sections 5, 9, 12(2) to (6), 18 to 20, 39(4), 42(2), 43 and 45, together with parts of sections 16 and 47. Further provisions were repealed by the Statute Law Revision Act 1953 (2 & 3 Eliz. 2. c. 5), the Income Tax Act 1952 (15 & 16 Geo. 6 & 1 Eliz. 2. c. 10), the Finance Act 1958 (6 & 7 Eliz. 2. c. 56), the Local Government Act 1958 (6 & 7 Eliz. 2. c. 55), the Finance Act 1963 (c. 25), the Statute Law Revision Act 1964 (c. 79), the Land Charges Act 1972 (c. 61), the Statute Law (Repeals) Act 1975 (c. 10) and the Endowments and Glebe Measure 1976 (1976 No. 4).

Section 56 of the Finance Act 1977 (c. 36) extinguished the redemption annuities charged under the act on 1 October 1977, and section 59(5) of, and part V of schedule 9 to, that act repealed sections 3, 10, 11, 12(1), 15, 17, 29 and 34 and parts of sections 4, 13, 16 and 47. Part II of the act, comprising sections 24 to 28, was repealed by section 187(2) of, and part XIV of schedule 17 to, the Finance Act 1989 (c. 26), which also repealed sections 2(1), 7 and 31(7) and parts of schedule 7. Section 30 and schedule 6 were repealed by the Statute Law (Repeals) Act 1998 (c. 43), and section 38 and schedule 8 by the Church of England (Miscellaneous Provisions) Measure 2000 (2000 No. 1).

Section 39(1) was amended by section 107(1) of, and schedule 3 to, the Arbitration Act 1996 (c. 23) with effect from 31 January 1997. (Note: The Arbitration Act 1996 (Commencement No. 1) Order 1996 (SI 1996/3146).)

Sections 1, 4, 6, 21, 32, 33, 36(1), 39 to 42 and 44, together with schedule 2 and parts of section 47, were repealed by section 1(1) of, and group 3 of part 6 of schedule 1 to, the Statute Law (Repeals) Act 2004 (c. 14), which came into force on 22 July 2004. Sections 31, 35, 37, 47 and 48 and parts of schedules 3 and 7 remain in force.
