= Assignment and Sub-letting of Land (Ireland) Act 1826 =

Act of the Parliament of the United Kingdom

- Act of Parliament
- Parliament of the United Kingdom
- Long title: An Act to amend the Law of Ireland respecting the Assignment and Subletting of Lands and Tenements.
- Citation: 7 Geo. 4. c. 29
- Territorial extent: Ireland (Note: Section 1.)

Dates
- Royal assent: 5 May 1826
- Commencement: 5 May 1826 (Note: The Acts of Parliament (Commencement) Act 1793.)
- Repealed: 1 January 1861
Other legislation
Amended by	Landlord and Tenant Law Amendment (Ireland) Act 1860
Repealed by	Landlord and Tenant Law Amendment Act Ireland 1860

Status: Repealed

Text of statute as originally enacted

The Assignment and Sub-letting of Land (Ireland) Act 1826 (7 Geo. 4. c. 29), also known as the Landlord and Tenant (Ireland) Act 1826, was an act of the Parliament of the United Kingdom enacted during that year of the reign of George IV.

== Subsequent developments ==
The whole act was repealed, with savings, by section 104 of, and schedule (B.) to, the Landlord and Tenant Law Amendment (Ireland) Act 1860 (23 & 24 Vict. c. 154), which came into force on 1 January 1861.
