= Octennial Act =

Act of the Parliament of Ireland

- Act of Parliament
- Parliament of Ireland
- Long title: An act for limiting the duration of parliaments.
- Citation: 37 Geo. 3. c. 3 (I)
- Introduced by: Charles Lucas
- Territorial extent: Ireland

Dates
- Royal assent: 16 February 1768
- Commencement: 20 October 1767 (Note: Start of session.)
- Repealed: 3 July 1879

Other legislation
- Repealed by: Statute Law Revision (Ireland) Act 1879
- Relates to: Poynings' Law

Status: Repealed

Text of statute as originally enacted

The Octennial Act (7 Geo. 3. c. 3 (I); long title An act for limiting the duration of parliaments) was a 1768 (Note: The act was passed in the 1767–68 session; the year may be quoted as the Octennial Act 1767 (start of session) or Octennial Act 1768 (when royal assent received).) act of the Parliament of Ireland which set a maximum duration of eight years for the Irish House of Commons. Before this, a dissolution of parliament was not required except on the demise of the Crown, and the previous three general elections were held in 1715, 1727, and 1761, on the respective deaths of Anne, George I, and George II. After the act, general elections were held in 1769, 76, 83, 90, and 98.

Limiting the duration of parliament was a prime objective of the Patriot Party. Heads of bills were brought, by Charles Lucas in 1761 and 1763 and by Henry Flood in 1765, to limit parliament to seven years as the Septennial Act 1716 did for the Parliament of Great Britain. The heads were rejected by the Privy Council of Great Britain, which, under Poynings' Law (10 Hen. 7. c. 4 (I), had to pre-approve any bill before it was formally introduced in the Irish parliament.

Since the end of the Seven Years' War in 1763, the British government had wished to increase the size of Irish regiments, the part of the British Army charged on the Irish exchequer rather than the British. In 1767, the Chatham Ministry appointed George Townshend, 4th Viscount Townshend as Lord Lieutenant of Ireland and instructed him to secure the support of the Irish parliament for an Augmentation Bill to effect this increase. The British considered several possible concessions to win over the Patriot Party, and at his speech from the throne, Townshend promised judicial tenure quamdiu se bene gesserint (on the model of the Act of Settlement 1701) and hinted at a Septennial Act. Lucas again introduced heads of a Septennial Bill on 20 October 1767; Barry Maxwell introduced heads of a judicial tenure bill the same day. In November, the appointment of James Hewitt, 1st Baron Lifford as Lord Chancellor of Ireland alienated the Undertakers who had hoped for the post. In addition, the British Privy Council added a wrecking clause to the judicial tenure bill, which caused the Irish parliament to reject the bill once returned to Dublin. The council also made three amendments to Lucas' bill: to the preamble, to extend the limit from seven to eight years (thus an Octennial Bill) and to bring forward the date of the next general election from 1774 to 1768. According to Francis Plowden, the Privy Council insisted on the modification to eight years as a wrecking amendment, expecting that the Irish parliament would reject the bill on principle once any amendment had been made to it, and was disappointed when its amended bill was passed. W. E. H. Lecky calls this "without foundation", stating the actual reasons for eight years were that the Irish Parliament only met every second year, and to reduce the chance of Irish and British general elections coinciding.

== Subsequent developments ==
The Octennial Act reinvigorated the Commons, both with newly elected reformers and with MPs made more active by the prospect of imminent re-election. Changes included more assertiveness over supply bills and Poynings' Law, easing the penal laws, and securing the Constitution of 1782. There were unsuccessful attempts to shorten the maximum duration, in 1773 by Sir William Parsons and in 1777 by Sir Edward Newenham.

The act was rendered moot when the Parliament of Ireland was abolished by the Act of Union 1800. The whole act was repealed by section 1 of, and the schedule to, the Statute Law Revision (Ireland) Act 1879 (42 & 43 Vict. c. 24).

== Sources ==
- "The Seventh Year of George III; Chap.III: An Act for limiting the Duration of Parliaments.". Statutes Passed in the Parliaments Held in Ireland. Vol. V: 1761–1772. George Grierson, printer to the King's Most Excellent Majesty. 1795. p. 340.
- "For limiting the duration of parliaments". Irish legislation database (ILD). Queen's University Belfast. No.2174.
- Bartlett, Thomas (July 1981). "The Augmentation of the Army in Ireland 1767–1769". The English Historical Review. 96 (380). Oxford University Press: 540–559. doi:10.1093/ehr/xcvi.ccclxxx.540. JSTOR 568903.
- Bartlett, Thomas (1979). "The Irish House of Commons' Rejection of the 'Privy Council' Money Bill in 1769: A Re-Assessment". Studia Hibernica (19). St. Patrick's College, Drumcondra: 63–77. JSTOR 20496137.
- McGrath, Charles Ivar (2001). "Central Aspects of the Eighteenth-Century Constitutional Framework in Ireland: The Government Supply Bill and Biennial Parliamentary Sessions, 1715–82". Eighteenth-Century Ireland / Iris an dá chultúr. 16. Eighteenth-Century Ireland Society: 9–34. JSTOR 30071247.
