= Landlord and Tenant Act 1851 =

Act of the Parliament of the United Kingdom

Landlord and Tenant Act 1851 (Note: The citation of this act by this short title was authorised by section 1 of, and the first schedule to, the Short Titles Act 1896. Due to the repeal of those provisions it is now authorised by section 19(2) of the Interpretation Act 1978.)
- Act of Parliament
- Parliament of the United Kingdom
- Long title: An Act to improve the law of landlord and tenant in relation to emblements, to growing crops seized in execution, and to agricultural tenants fixtures.
- Citation: 14 & 15 Vict. c. 25
- Territorial extent: England and Wales; Ireland; (Note: Section 5.)

Dates
- Royal assent: 24 July 1851
- Commencement: 24 July 1851 (Note: Section 3.)
- Repealed: 6 April 2014 (Note: The Tribunals, Courts and Enforcement Act 2007 (Commencement No. 11) Order 2014 (SI 2014/768).)
Other legislation
Amended by	Landlord and Tenant Law Amendment (Ireland) Act 1860; Statute Law Revision Act 1892; Agriculture Act 1920; Tithe Act 1936; Statute Law (Repeals) Act 1971
Repealed by	Tribunals, Courts and Enforcement Act 2007

Status: Repealed

Text of statute as originally enacted

Revised text of statute as amended

The Landlord and Tenant Act 1851 (14 & 15 Vict. c. 25) was an act of the Parliament of the United Kingdom that regulates the relationship between tenants and their landlords.

== Subsequent developments ==
Section 1 was repealed for Ireland by section 104 of, and schedule (B.) to, the Landlord and Tenant Law Amendment (Ireland) Act 1860 (23 & 24 Vict. c. 154), which came into force on 1 January 1861.

Section 4 of the act was repealed by section 48(3) of, and the ninth schedule to, the Tithe Act 1936 (26 Geo. 5 & 1 Edw. 8. c. 43), which came into force on 31 July 1936.

Sections 1 and 3 of the act were repealed by section 1 of, and the part IX of the schedule to, the Statute Law (Repeals) Act 1971, which came into force on 27 July 1971.

The whole act was repealed by section 146 of, and part 4 of schedule 23 to, the Tribunals, Courts and Enforcement Act 2007, which came into force on 6 April 2014.
