= List of acts of the Parliament of Ireland, 1761–1770 =

This is a list of acts of the Parliament of Ireland for the years from 1761 to 1770.

The number shown by each act's title is its chapter number. Acts are cited using this number, preceded by the years of the reign during which the relevant parliamentary session was held; thus the act concerning assay passed in 1783 is cited as "23 & 24 Geo. 3. c. 23", meaning the 23rd act passed during the session that started in the 23rd year of the reign of George III and which finished in the 24th year of that reign. The modern convention is to use Arabic numerals in citations (thus "40 Geo. 3" rather than "40 Geo. III"). Acts of the reign of Elizabeth I are formally cited without a regnal numeral in the Republic of Ireland.

Acts passed by the Parliament of Ireland did not have a short title; however, some of these acts have subsequently been given a short title by acts of the Parliament of the United Kingdom, acts of the Parliament of Northern Ireland, or acts of the Oireachtas. This means that some acts have different short titles in the Republic of Ireland and Northern Ireland respectively. Official short titles are indicated by the flags of the respective jurisdictions.

A number of the acts included in this list are still in force in Northern Ireland or the Republic of Ireland. Because these two jurisdictions are entirely separate, the version of an act in force in one may differ from the version in force in the other; similarly, an act may have been repealed in one but not in the other.

A number of acts passed by the Parliament of Great Britain also extended to Ireland during this period.

== 1 Geo. 3 (1761) ==
The 1st session of the 1st parliament of George III, which met from 22 October 1761 to 30 April 1762.

This session was also traditionally cited as 1 G. 3.

=== Public acts ===
Short title, or popular name	Citation	Royal assent
Long title
Import Duties and Prohibitions Act 1761 (repealed)	1 Geo. 3. c. 1 (I)	18 December 1761
An Act for granting and continuing to his Majesty an additional duty on beer, ale, strong waters, wine, tobacco hides, and other goods and merchandizes therein mentioned; and for prohibiting the importation of all gold and silver lace, except of the manufacture of Great Britain. (Repealed by Statute Law Revision (Ireland) Act 1879 (42 & 43 Vict. c. 24))
Additional Duties and Loan Act 1761 (repealed)	1 Geo. 3. c. 2 (I)	24 November 1761
An Act for granting to his Majesty a further additional duty on wine, silk, hops, china, earthen, japanned, lacquered ware, and vinegar; and for better securing the repayment of one hundred and fifty thousand pounds, paid into the treasury for the support of his Majesty's government pursuant to an act of the last session, (Note: Additional Duties and Funds Act 1759 (33 Geo. 2. c. 2 (I))) together with the interest thereof; and for securing the repayment of such sums of money, not exceeding in the whole the sum three hundred thousand pounds, as have been or shall be paid into the treasury, or shall be advanced to his present Majesty, pursuant to the resolutions of the house of commons the last session of Parliament, together with the interest thereof. (Repealed by Statute Law Revision (Ireland) Act 1879 (42 & 43 Vict. c. 24))
Judgments and Rents Recovery Act 1761 (repealed)	1 Geo. 3. c. 3 (I)	24 November 1761
An Act to perpetuate with amendments a clause in an act passed in the ninth year of his late Majesty King George the second, intituled, "An Act for the more effectual assigning of judgments, and for the more speedy recovery of rents by distress." (Note: Judgments Assignment and Rents Recovery Act 1735 (9 Geo. 2. c. 5 (I))) (Repealed by Statute Law Revision (Ireland) Act 1879 (42 & 43 Vict. c. 24))
Qualification Indemnity Act 1761 (repealed)	1 Geo. 3. c. 4 (I)	18 December 1761
An Act for allowing further time to persons in offices or employments to qualify themselves pursuant to an act, intituled, "An Act to prevent the further growth of popery." (Note: Popery Act 1703 (2 Anne c. 6 (I))) (Repealed by Statute Law Revision (Ireland) Act 1879 (42 & 43 Vict. c. 24))
Loan Duties Act 1761 (repealed)	1 Geo. 3. c. 5 (I)	2 March 1762
An Act for granting to his Majesty the several duties, rates, and impositions therein expressed, to be applied to pay an interest at the rate of five pounds per centum per annum for the several sums therein provided for, and towards the discharge of the said principal sums. (Repealed by Statute Law Revision (Ireland) Act 1879 (42 & 43 Vict. c. 24))
Hawkers and Pedlars Act 1761 (repealed)	1 Geo. 3. c. 6 (I)	30 April 1762
An Act for licensing hawkers and pedlars; and for encouragement of English protestant schools. (Repealed by Statute Law Revision (Ireland) Act 1879 (42 & 43 Vict. c. 24))
Revenue Laws Act 1761 (repealed)	1 Geo. 3. c. 7 (I)	30 April 1762
An Act for continuing and amending an act, (Note: Revenue Collection and Frauds Act 1759 (33 Geo. 2. c. 10 (I))) intituled, "An act for better regulating the collection of his Majesty's revenue, and for preventing frauds therein; and for repealing an act made the last session of Parliament, (Note: Revenue and Frauds Act 1757 (31 Geo. 2. c. 6 (I))) intituled, 'An Act for continuing and amending several laws heretofore made relating to his Majesty's revenue and for the more effectual preventing of frauds in his Majesty's customs and excise, and the several acts and statutes which are mentioned in the said act and continued thereby." (Repealed by Statute Law Revision (Ireland) Act 1879 (42 & 43 Vict. c. 24))
Hospitals Act 1761^{(Republic of Ireland)}	1 Geo. 3. c. 8 (I)	30 April 1762
An Act to enable Tenants for Life to make perpetual Leases of Grounds whereon to erect public Hospitals.
Gold and Silver Thread Act 1761^{(Republic of Ireland)} (repealed)	1 Geo. 3. c. 9 (I)	30 April 1762
An Act to prevent the counterfeiting Gold and Silver Lace, and for settling and adjusting the Proportions of fine Gold, Silver, and Silk, and for the better making of Gold and Silver Thread. (Repealed by Hallmarking Act 1973 (c. 43))
Dublin Coal Price Act 1761	1 Geo. 3. c. 10 (I)	30 April 1762
An Act to prevent the excessive price of coals in the city of Dublin.
Justices of Peace Abuses Act 1761 (repealed)	1 Geo. 3. c. 11 (I)	30 April 1762
An Act to prevent abuses committed by justices of peace, acting under the charters of cities and towns corporate. (Repealed by Statute Law Revision (Ireland) Act 1879 (42 & 43 Vict. c. 24))
Protestant Purchasers Security Act 1761 (repealed)	1 Geo. 3. c. 12 (I)	30 April 1762
An Act for the security of protestant purchasers. (Repealed by Statute Law Revision (Ireland) Act 1879 (42 & 43 Vict. c. 24))
Converts from Popery Possessions Act 1761 (repealed)	1 Geo. 3. c. 13 (I)	30 April 1762
An Act for quieting the possessions of protestants, deriving under converts from the popish religion. (Repealed by Statute Law Revision (Ireland) Act 1879 (42 & 43 Vict. c. 24))
Royal College of Physicians Act 1761^{(Republic of Ireland)}	1 Geo. 3. c. 14 (I)	30 April 1762
An Act for preventing Frauds and Abuses in the vending, preparing, and administring Drugs and Medicines.
Banbridge to Belfast Road Act 1761	1 Geo. 3. c. 15 (I)	30 April 1762
An Act for altering and amending an act of Parliament passed in the seventh year of the reign of his late Majesty King George the second, intituled, "An Act for repairing the road leading from the bridge over the Bann-water, commonly called the Bann-bridge, (Note: Banbridge, County Down.) in the county of Down, to the town of Belfast (Note: Belfast, County Antrim.) in the county of Antrim." (Note: Banbridge to Belfast Road Act 1733 (7 Geo. 2. c. 23 (I)))
Insolvent Debtors Relief Act 1761 (repealed)	1 Geo. 3. c. 16 (I)	30 April 1762
An Act for the relief of insolvent debtors. (Repealed by Statute Law Revision (Ireland) Act 1879 (42 & 43 Vict. c. 24))
Municipal Corporations Act 1761^{(Republic of Ireland)} or the Expiring Laws Act (Ireland) 1761^{(United Kingdom)}	1 Geo. 3. c. 17 (I)	30 April 1762
An Act for reviving, continuing, and amending several temporary Statutes, and for other purposes therein mentioned.
City of Cork Act 1761^{(Republic of Ireland)}	1 Geo. 3. c. 18 (I)	30 April 1762
An Act for the more easy and equal assessing and applotting all money presented by the grand jury of each assizes to be held for the city, and county of the city, of Cork; and for putting the coaches, chaises, chairs, and sedans, that ply for hire in the said city, under the like regulations for the benefit of the work-house of Cork, as they are in Dublin; and also for the better regulating the harbour of Cork.
Cork Bridges and Water Supply Act 1761	1 Geo. 3. c. 19 (I)	30 April 1762
An act for building a stone bridge from the quay opposite Prince's Street in the city of Cork to Lavit's-Island, and a stone bridge from thence to the Red-abbey marsh, with a draw-bridge or lifting-bridge of wood in the center of the latter, sufficient to let vessels pass and repass; and also for supplying the said city with water.

=== Private acts ===
Short title, or popular name	Citation	Royal assent
Long title
Burton's Estate Act 1761	1 Geo. 3. c. 1 Pr. (I)	2 March 1762
An Act for rectifying a mistake in the marriage settlement of Francis Pierpoint Burton, esquire, with Elizabeth, his present wife, and for vesting the said Francis Pierpoint Burtons estate in the county of Limerick in him the said Francis Pierpoint Burton, his heirs and assigns forever.
Wilson's Hospital School Act 1761^{(Republic of Ireland)}	1 Geo. 3. c. 2 Pr. (I)	30 April 1762
An Act for incorporating the trustees of Wilson's Hospital in the county of Westmeath, and for other purposes mentioned therein.
Croker's Estate Act 1761	1 Geo. 3. c. 3 Pr. (I)	30 April 1762
An Act to enable Henry Croker, esquire, to make leases of his estate of three lives, or 31 years, at a full improved rent, and to charge his estate with a jointure for any wife he shall marry, not exceeding £500 by the year.
King's Estate Act 1761	1 Geo. 3. c. 4 Pr. (I)	30 April 1762
An Act for confirming and establishing an agreement made between Sir Edward King, baronet, and Henry King, esquire, concerning the real and personal estate whereof Robert, late Lord Kingsborough, died seized and possessed, and for making said agreement more effectual, for raising a sufficient sum of money for discharging the debts and encumbrances affecting the said real estate, and other purposes.
Perceval's Estate Act 1761	1 Geo. 3. c. 5 Pr. (I)	30 April 1762
An Act for vesting certain lands, tenements and hereditaments situate in the county of Tipperary in the kingdom of Ireland, the estate of Philip Perceval, esquire, in trustees, in order that the same may be sold for the payment of debts and other encumbrances affecting the same, and also the estate of the said Philip Perceval situate in the county of Sligo to be settled to the same uses, as the said Sligo estate now stands limited.
Reddy's and Reddy's Creditors Act 17612	1 Geo. 3. c. 6 Pr. (I)	30 April 1762
An Act for explaining, amending and carrying more effectually into execution an act entitled an act for the relief of the creditors of Daniel Reddy, esquire, and Dudley Reddy, his brother, deceased, by sale of their real and personal estates for payment of their debts.
Blake's Estate Act 1761	1 Geo. 3. c. 7 Pr. (I)	30 April 1762
An Act for vesting several lands, tenements and hereditaments in the counties of Galway and Mayo, late the estate of Robert Blake of Ardfry, esquire, deceased, and of Richard Blake his son, deceased, in trustees for sale of a competent part thereof for payment of debts and encumbrances affecting the same, and for settling the residue thereof to and for the several uses, intents and purposes therein mentioned.
Hickman's Estate Act 1761	1 Geo. 3. c. 8 Pr. (I)	30 April 1762
An Act for vesting the estate of Robert Hickman, late of Barntick in the county of Clare, esquire, deceased, in trustees, to be sold for payment of the debts and encumbrances affecting the same, and for applying the surplus purchase money, or such part of the said estate as shall remain unsold, according to intention of said Robert Hickman's will.
Mosse's Estate Act 1761	1 Geo. 3. c. 9 Pr. (I)	30 April 1762
An Act to enable Charles Mosse, during his minority, and in case of his death without issue, to enable Jane Mosse, during her minority, by and with the consent of their guardians, to make leases for lives or years of certain plots or pieces of ground in the county of Dublin and county of the city of Dublin, and that such leases being made without fine, and at the best and highest rent, may be good against all persons.

=== Sources ===
- "Acts of Parliament by Session: 1761". Irish Legislation Database. Queen's University Belfast.
- "Pre-Union Irish Statutes: 1761 Acts". Irish Statute Book. Attorney General of Ireland.

== 3 Geo. 3 (1763) ==
The 2nd session of the 1st parliament of George III, which met from 11 October 1763 to 12 May 1764.

This session was also traditionally cited as 3 G. 3.

=== Public acts ===
Short title, or popular name	Citation	Royal assent
Long title
Additional Duties Act 1763 (repealed)	3 Geo. 3. c. 1 (I)	23 December 1763
An Act for granting and continuing to his majesty an additional duty on beer, ale, strong waters, wine, tobacco, hides and other goods and merchandises therein mentioned, and for prohibiting the importation of all gold and silver lace, except of the manufacture of Great Britain. (Repealed by Statute Law Revision (Ireland) Act 1879 (42 & 43 Vict. c. 24))
Loan Duties Act 1763 (repealed)	3 Geo. 3. c. 2 (I)	23 December 1763
An Act for granting to his majesty the several duties, rates and impositions therein expressed to be applied to pay an interest at the rate of £4 per centum per annum for part of the sums therein provided for, and an interest at the rate of £5 per annum for the residue of the sums therein also provided for, and towards the discharge of the said principal sums. (Repealed by Statute Law Revision (Ireland) Act 1879 (42 & 43 Vict. c. 24))
Qualification Indemnity Act 1763 (repealed)	3 Geo. 3. c. 3 (I)	12 May 1764
An Act for allowing further Time to Persons in Offices or Employments to qualify themselves pursuant to an Act intituled "An Act to prevent the further growth of Popery." (Note: Popery Act 1703 (2 Anne c. 6 (I))) (Repealed by Statute Law Revision (Ireland) Act 1879 (42 & 43 Vict. c. 24))
Hawkers and Pedlars Act 1763 (repealed)	3 Geo. 3. c. 4 (I)	12 May 1764
An Act for licensing Hawkers and Pedlars, and for encouragement of English Protestant Schools. (Repealed by Statute Law Revision (Ireland) Act 1879 (42 & 43 Vict. c. 24))
Acquitted Prisoners Fees Act 1763	3 Geo. 3. c. 5 (I)	12 May 1764
An Act for discharging without fees persons who shall be acquitted of offences for which they are or shall be indicted, and for making a compensation to sheriffs, gaolers, clerks of the crown and clerks of the peace for such fees.
Lagan Navigation Act 1763	3 Geo. 3. c. 6 (I)	12 May 1764
An Act for continuing and amending an act entitled "An Act for making the River Lagan navigable, and opening a passage by water from Lough Neagh to the town of Belfast in the county of Antrim." (Note: Lagan Navigation Act 1753 (27 Geo. 2. c. 3 (I)))
Grand Juries Presentments Act 1763	3 Geo. 3. c. 7 (I)	12 May 1764
An Act for regulating the proceedings of grand juries in their preparing and forming of presentments for the levying of money.
Parish Watches and Highways Act 1763	3 Geo. 3. c. 8 (I)	12 May 1764
An Act for amending an act entitled "An Act to explain and amend an act passed in the 6th of his late majesty King George I (Note: Parish Watches, Highways, and Public Money Act 1719 (6 Geo. 1. c. 10 (I))) entitled 'An Act for the better regulating the parish watches and amending the highways in this kingdom, and for preventing the misapplication of public money.'"
Dublin Corn and Flour Supply Act 1763 (repealed)	3 Geo. 3. c. 9 (I)	12 May 1764
An Act for explaining an Act intituled "An Act for better supplying the City of Dublin with Corn and Flour;" (Note: Dublin Corn and Flour Supply Act 1757 (31 Geo. 2. c. 3 (I))) and also an Act (Note: Dublin Corn and Flour Supply (Amendment) Act 1759 (33 Geo. 2. c. 12 (I))) intituled "An Act for amending an Act intituled 'An Act for better supplying the City of Dublin with Corn and Flour.'" (Repealed by Statute Law Revision (Ireland) Act 1879 (42 & 43 Vict. c. 24))
Willcocks and Dawson's Bank Creditors Act 1763	3 Geo. 3. c. 10 (I)	12 May 1764
An Act for the more effectual carrying into execution an act entitled "An Act for the relief of the creditors of the bank lately kept by John Willcocks and John Dawson, and of the creditors of the bank lately kept by Joseph Fade and John Willcocks, and of the creditors of the bank lately kept by Joseph Fade, Isachar Willcocks and John Willcocks, and of the creditors of the bank lately kept by Joseph Fade, and for raising out of the estates real and personal of Richard Brewer, late the cash keeper to the said John Willcocks and John Dawson, the sum due by the said Richard Brewer to the said John Willcocks and John Dawson." (Note: Willcocks and Dawson's Bank Creditors Act 1755 (29 Geo. 2. c. 22 (I)))
Tillage and Bogs Improvement Act 1763 (repealed)	3 Geo. 3. c. 11 (I)	12 May 1764
An Act or altering and amending an act (Note: Tillage and Bogs Improvement Act 1751 (25 Geo. 2. c. 10 (I))) entitled "An Act for amending an act (Note: Tillage, Bogs, Duties, and Wool Export Act 1729 (3 Geo. 2. c. 3 (I))) entitled 'An Act for encouragement of tillage and better employment of the poor, and also for the more effectual putting in execution an act (Note: Bogs Draining and Inland Carriage Act 1715 (2 Geo. 1. c. 12 (I))) entitled "An Act to encourage the draining and improving of bogs and unprofitable low grounds, and for easing and dispatching the inland carriage and conveyance of goods from one part to another in this kingdom," and also for laying several duties upon coaches, berlins, chariots, calashes, chaises and chairs, and upon cards and dice, and upon wrought and manufactured gold and silver plate, imported into or made in Ireland for the purposes therein mentioned, and also for repealing the duties payable upon the exportation of wool, bay yarn and woollen yarn out of this kingdom for England.'" (Repealed by Statute Law Revision (Ireland) Act 1879 (42 & 43 Vict. c. 24))
Flaxen and Hempen Manufactures Act 1763 (repealed)	3 Geo. 3. c. 12 (I)	12 May 1764
An Act for continuing the encouragement given by former Acts of Parliament to the Flaxen and Hempen Manufactures. (Repealed by Statute Law Revision (Ireland) Act 1879 (42 & 43 Vict. c. 24))
Bribery and Corruption Act 1763 (repealed)	3 Geo. 3. c. 13 (I)	12 May 1764
An Act for the more effectual preventing Bribery and Corruption in the Election of Members to serve in Parliament, and the Magistrates of Cities, Boroughs, and Towns Corporate. (Repealed by Statute Law Revision (Ireland) Act 1879 (42 & 43 Vict. c. 24))
Dublin Society Act 1763 (repealed)	3 Geo. 3. c. 14 (I)	12 May 1764
An Act for directing the application of the Sum of Eight Thousand Pounds granted to the Dublin Society for the encouragement of such Trades and Manufactures as should be directed by Parliament. (Repealed by Statute Law Revision (Ireland) Act 1879 (42 & 43 Vict. c. 24))
Dublin Port Act 1763 (repealed)	3 Geo. 3. c. 15 (I)	12 May 1764
An Act for vesting further powers in the lord mayor, sheriffs, commons and citizens of the city of Dublin for the securing of ships trading to the port and harbour of Dublin. (Repealed by Dublin Port Act 1786 (26 Geo. 3. c. 19 (I)))
Charities Act 1763	3 Geo. 3. c. 16 (I)	12 May 1764
An Act for continuing and amending several temporary Statutes, and for other purposes therein mentioned.
City of Cork Regulation Act 1763	3 Geo. 3. c. 17 (I)	12 May 1764
An Act for continuing and amending certain temporary statutes heretofore made for the better regulation of the city of Cork, and for enlarging the salary of the treasurer, and for the better regulating the sale of coals in the said city, and for erecting and continuing lamps in the same, and for the better preserving the streets and highways therein, and for confirming and establishing a court of conscience in the said city, and for regulating the assize of bread therein, and for securing the quays by parapet walls.
Charitable Donations and Bequests Act 1763	3 Geo. 3. c. 18 (I)	12 May 1764
An Act for the better discovery of charitable donations and bequests.
Riot Act 1763^{(Republic of Ireland)}	3 Geo. 3. c. 19 (I)	12 May 1764
An Act for indemnifying all such persons as have been or shall be aiding in the dispersing of riots, and apprehending the rioters.
Expiring Laws Continuance Act 1763 (repealed)	3 Geo. 3. c. 20 (I)	12 May 1764
An Act for continuing several temporary Statutes. (Repealed by Statute Law Revision (Ireland) Act 1879 (42 & 43 Vict. c. 24))
Customs and Excise Frauds Act 1763 (repealed)	3 Geo. 3. c. 21 (I)	12 May 1764
An Act for continuing and amending two several Acts of Parliament therein mentioned, and for the more effectual preventing of Frauds in His Majesty's Customs and Excise, and for other purposes therein mentioned. (Repealed by Statute Law Revision (Ireland) Act 1879 (42 & 43 Vict. c. 24))
Quit, Crown, and Composition Rents Arrears Act 1763 (repealed)	3 Geo. 3. c. 22 (I)	12 May 1764
An Act for discharging all Arrears of Quit, Crown, and Composition Rents, which have been growing due for Twenty Years last past, on the Terms and in the Manner therein mentioned. (Repealed by Statute Law Revision (Ireland) Act 1879 (42 & 43 Vict. c. 24))
Game Act 1763 (repealed)	3 Geo. 3. c. 23 (I)	12 May 1764
An Act for the better Preservation of the Game. (Repealed by Statute Law Revision (Ireland) Act 1879 (42 & 43 Vict. c. 24))
Fisheries Act 1763	3 Geo. 3. c. 24 (I)	12 May 1764
An Act for the encouragement of the fisheries of this kingdom.
Tithes Act 1763 (repealed)	3 Geo. 3. c. 25 (I)	12 May 1764
An Act to amend and explain an Act made in the Thirty-third Year of the Reign of Henry the Eight, intituled "An Act for Tythes," (Note: Tithes Act 1542 (33 Hen. 8. c. 12 (I))) and for other Purposes therein mentioned. (Repealed by Statute Law Revision (Ireland) Act 1879 (42 & 43 Vict. c. 24))
Protestants' Titles Act 1763 (repealed)	3 Geo. 3. c. 26 (I)	12 May 1764
An Act for confirming the Titles and for quieting the Possessions of Protestants, and for giving Time to Converts from Popery to perform the requisites of Conformity prescribed by the Laws against Popery. (Repealed by Statute Law Revision (Ireland) Act 1879 (42 & 43 Vict. c. 24))
Dublin Coal Price Act 1763	3 Geo. 3. c. 27 (I)	12 May 1764
An Act for amending and continuing an act entitled "An Act to prevent the excessive price of coals in the city of Dublin." (Note: Dublin Coal Price Act 1761 (1 Geo. 3. c. 10 (I)))
Criminal Justice Act 1763 or the Criminal Justice Act (Ireland) 1763 (repealed)	3 Geo. 3. c. 28 (I)	12 May 1764
An Act for better preventing the severities and unjust exactions practised by gaolers against their prisoners, and for more effectually supporting prosecutions at the suit of the crown in cases of felony and treason. (Repealed for the Republic of Ireland by Statute Law Revision (Pre-Union Irish Statutes) Act 1962 (No. 29) and for Northern Ireland by Judicature (Northern Ireland) Act 1978 (c. 23))
Burning of Land Act 1763 (repealed)	3 Geo. 3. c. 29 (I)	12 May 1764
An Act for the more effectual preventing the pernicious Practice of burning Land. (Repealed by Landlord and Tenant Law Amendment (Ireland) Act 1860 (23 & 24 Vict. c. 154) and for the Republic of Ireland by Statute Law Revision (Pre-Union Irish Statutes) Act 1962 (No. 29))
Dublin to Dunleer Road Act 1763	3 Geo. 3. c. 30 (I)	12 May 1764
An Act for the more effectual amending and repairing the road leading from the city of Dublin (Note: Dublin.) to the bridge of Dunleer (Note: Dunleer, County Louth.) in the county of Louth, and for the better securing the debts now due or which shall hereafter become due to the creditors of the said road.
Dundalk to Banbridge Road Act 1763	3 Geo. 3. c. 31 (I)	12 May 1764
An Act for the more effectually amending and repairing the road leading from the town of Dundalk in the county of Louth to Banbridge in the county of Down, and for the better securing the debts now due, or which shall hereafter become due to the creditors of the said road.
Dublin to Kilkenny Road Act 1763	3 Geo. 3. c. 32 (I)	12 May 1764
An Act for altering, amending and making more effectual the laws for the repair of the road leading from the city of Dublin, through the towns of Kilcullen and Carlow, to the city of Kilkenny.
Hides, Leather, and Shoes Act 1763 (repealed)	3 Geo. 3. c. 33 (I)	12 May 1764
An Act to prevent Frauds in the tanning of Hides, in the currying of Leather, and the making of Shoes and Boots. (Repealed by Statute Law Revision (Ireland) Act 1879 (42 & 43 Vict. c. 24))
Linen Manufacturers Act 1763	3 Geo. 3. c. 34 (I)	12 May 1764
An Act for the better Regulation of the Linen and Hempen Manufactures.
Salmon Preservation Act 1763 (repealed)	3 Geo. 3. c. 35 (I)	12 May 1764
An Act to explain and amend the several laws made in this kingdom for the effectual preservation of salmon fish. (Repealed by Fisheries (Ireland) Act 1842 (5 & 6 Vict. c. 106))
Dublin Approaches Act 1763	3 Geo. 3. c. 36 (I)	12 May 1764
An Act for making more convenient the approaches to the city of Dublin by making a new turnpike road on the south side, the west side and the north side of the said city, to commence at the road leading from Dublin to Donnybrook, and to terminate at Cavendish Street.
Kinnegad to Athlone Road Act 1763	3 Geo. 3. c. 37 (I)	12 May 1764
An Act for reviving, continuing and amending an act passed in the 7th year of the reign of his late majesty King George II entitled "An Act for repairing the road leading from the town of Kinnegad (Note: Kinnegad, County Westmeath.) in the county of Westmeath to the town of Athlone (Note: Athlone, County Westmeath.) in the said county." (Note: Kinnegad to Athlone Road Act 1733 (7 Geo. 2. c. 19 (I)))

=== Private acts ===
Short title, or popular name	Citation	Royal assent
Long title
Moore's Estate Act 1763	3 Geo. 3. c. 1 Pr. (I)	12 May 1764
An Act for vesting in trustees certain lands, tenements and hereditaments, the estate of Garrett Moore, esquire, in the county of Mayo and King's County, for raising a sufficient sum of money for the payment of debts affecting the same, and for enabling the said Garrett Moore to make leases of all, or any part thereof, for the term of three lives or 31 years, at the best improved rent in possession.
Sneyd's Creditors Act 1763	3 Geo. 3. c. 2 Pr. (I)	12 May 1764
An Act for the relief of the creditors of Edward Sneyd of the city of Dublin, late merchant.
Bryan's and Carleton's Creditors Act 1763	3 Geo. 3. c. 3 Pr. (I)	12 May 1764
An Act for the relief of the creditors of William Bryan, Samuel Bryan and Arthur Bryan, of the city of Dublin, late merchants, and of George Carleton of the same city, late merchant.
O'Brien's Estate Act 1763	3 Geo. 3. c. 4 Pr. (I)	12 May 1764
An Act for carrying into execution certain agreements made between Sir Edward O'Brien, baronet, and Lucius O'Brien, esquire, his eldest son and heir apparent, and for the better security and more immediate payment of the debts of the said Sir Edward O'Brien, and for providing portions for the younger children of the said Sir Edward O'Brien, and for other purposes.
Mary Knowles and Company Creditors Act 1763	3 Geo. 3. c. 5 Pr. (I)	12 May 1764
An Act for the relief of Mary Knowles and company, late of the city of Waterford, merchants, and for their creditors.
Clements' Estate Act 1763	3 Geo. 3. c. 6 Pr. (I)	12 May 1764
An Act for vesting the estate of Theophilus Clements of Rakenny in the county of Cavan, esquire, in trustees, to be sold for the payment of debts and encumbrances affecting the same, and for settling the residue, according to the will and codicil of Theophilus Clements of the city of Dublin, esquire, deceased, with power to the tenants for life of such residue, to settle a jointure thereout on such wives as they have or shall marry, and to make freehold leases.
Kelly's Creditors Act 1763	3 Geo. 3. c. 7 Pr. (I)	12 May 1764
An Act for the relief of creditors of Michael Kelly, late of the city of Limerick, merchant.
Benson's and Benson's Creditors Act 1763	3 Geo. 3. c. 8 Pr. (I)	12 May 1764
An Act for the relief of the creditors of Paul Benson and James Benson of the city of Cork, late merchants.
Saunderson's Estate Act 1763	3 Geo. 3. c. 9 Pr. (I)	12 May 1764
An Act for vesting in trustees certain lands, tenements and hereditaments, the estate of Alexander Saunderson, of Castle Saunderson, in the county of Cavan, esquire, for raising a sufficient sum of money for the payment of debts affecting the same, and for increasing the portions of the younger children of the said Alexander Saunderson, by Rose, his present wife.
Johnson's and Seaton's Creditors Act 1763	3 Geo. 3. c. 10 Pr. (I)	12 May 1764
An Act for the relief of David Johnson and John Seaton of the city of Dublin, late merchants, and their creditors.

=== Sources ===
- "Acts of Parliament by Session: 1763". Irish Legislation Database. Queen's University Belfast.
- "Pre-Union Irish Statutes: 1763 Acts". Irish Statute Book. Attorney General of Ireland.

== 5 Geo. 3 (1765) ==
The 3rd session of the 1st parliament of George III, which met from 22 October 1765 to 6 June 1766.

This session was also traditionally cited as 5 G. 3.

=== Public acts ===
Short title, or popular name	Citation	Royal assent
Long title
Additional Duties Act 1765 (repealed)	5 Geo. 3. c. 1 (I)	24 December 1765
An Act for granting to his majesty an additional duty on beer, ale, strong waters, wine, tobacco, hides and other goods and merchandises therein mentioned, and for prohibiting the importation of all gold and silver lace, except of the manufacture of Great Britain. (Repealed by Statute Law Revision (Ireland) Act 1879 (42 & 43 Vict. c. 24))
Loan Duties Act 1765 (repealed)	5 Geo. 3. c. 2 (I)	24 December 1765
An Act for granting to his majesty the several duties, rates and impositions therein expressed to be applied to pay as interest at the rate of £4 per centum per annum for the sums therein provided for, and towards the discharge of the said principal sums. (Repealed by Statute Law Revision (Ireland) Act 1879 (42 & 43 Vict. c. 24))
Spirits Distillation Prohibition Act 1765 (repealed)	5 Geo. 3. c. 3 (I)	24 December 1765
An Act to prevent the distilling of Spirits from Wheat, Oats, Bear, Barley, Rye, Meslin, Malt, Beans, and Peas, and from any Potatoes, Meal, or Flour of Wheat, Oats, Bear, Barley, Rye, Meslin, Malt, Beans, or Peas, for a limitted Time. (Repealed by Statute Law Revision (Ireland) Act 1879 (42 & 43 Vict. c. 24))
Corn Exportation Prohibition Act 1765 (repealed)	5 Geo. 3. c. 4 (I)	24 December 1765
An Act to prevent the Exportation of Corn under certain Restrictions for a limitted Time. (Repealed by Statute Law Revision (Ireland) Act 1879 (42 & 43 Vict. c. 24))
Brandy, Rum, and Gin Duties Act 1765 (repealed)	5 Geo. 3. c. 5 (I)	20 March 1766
An Act for ascertaining the Duty of Excise payable upon the Importation of Brandy, Rum, and Geneva. (Repealed by Statute Law Revision (Ireland) Act 1879 (42 & 43 Vict. c. 24))
Hawkers and Pedlars Act 1765 (repealed)	5 Geo. 3. c. 6 (I)	7 June 1766
An Act for licensing Hawkers and Pedlars, and for encouragement of English Protestant Schools. (Repealed by Statute Law Revision (Ireland) Act 1879 (42 & 43 Vict. c. 24))
Fisheries Act 1765	5 Geo. 3. c. 7 (I)	7 June 1766
An Act for explaining and amending an act (Note: Fisheries Act 1763 (3 Geo. 3. c. 24 (I))) for the encouragement of the fisheries of this kingdom.
Tumultuous Risings Act 1765 (repealed)	5 Geo. 3. c. 8 (I)	7 June 1766
An Act to prevent for the future tumultuous risings of Persons within this Kingdom, and for other Purposes therein mentioned. (Repealed by Statute Law Revision (Ireland) Act 1879 (42 & 43 Vict. c. 24))
Flaxen and Hempen Manufacture Act 1765	5 Geo. 3. c. 9 (I)	7 June 1766
An Act for explaining and amending the Laws relating to the Flaxen and Hempen Manufacture.
Burning of Land Act 1765 (repealed)	5 Geo. 3. c. 10 (I)	7 June 1766
An Act for the more effectually carrying into execution the Laws heretofore made to prevent the pernicious Practice of burning land. (Repealed by Landlord and Tenant Law Amendment (Ireland) Act 1860 (23 & 24 Vict. c. 154) and for the Republic of Ireland by Statute Law Revision (Pre-Union Irish Statutes) Act 1962 (No. 29))
Qualification Indemnity Act 1765 (repealed)	5 Geo. 3. c. 11 (I)	7 June 1766
An Act for allowing further Time to Persons in Offices or Employments to qualify themselves pursuant to an Act intituled "An Act to prevent the further growth of Popery." (Note: Popery Act 1703 (2 Anne c. 6 (I))) (Repealed by Statute Law Revision (Ireland) Act 1879 (42 & 43 Vict. c. 24))
Dublin Society Grant Act 1765	5 Geo. 3. c. 12 (I)	7 June 1766
An Act for directing the application of the Sum of Eight thousand Pounds granted to the Dublin Society for the Encouragement of such Trades and Manufactures as should be directed by Parliament.
Kanturk to Cork Road Act 1765	5 Geo. 3. c. 13 (I)	7 June 1766
An Act for making a turnpike road from the town of Kanturk (Note: Kanturk, County Cork.) in the county of Cork to Fairlane in the north liberties of the city of Cork.
Roads Act 1765^{(Republic of Ireland)}	5 Geo. 3. c. 14 (I)	7 June 1766
An Act for more effectually amending the Publick Roads.
Temporary Statutes and Kilkenny Treasurer Act 1765 (repealed)	5 Geo. 3. c. 15 (I)	7 June 1766
An Act for continuing, reviving, and amending several temporary Statutes, and for empowering the Grand Jury of the County of Kilkenny at the Assizes to increase the yearly Salary of the Treasurer of said County. (Repealed by Statute Law Revision (Ireland) Act 1879 (42 & 43 Vict. c. 24))
Revenue Laws Act 1765 (repealed)	5 Geo. 3. c. 16 (I)	7 June 1766
An Act for continuing and amending several Laws relating to His Majesty's Revenue, and for the more effectual preventing of Frauds therein, and for other purposes therein mentioned. (Repealed by Statute Law Revision (Ireland) Act 1879 (42 & 43 Vict. c. 24))
Timber Act 1765^{(Republic of Ireland)}	5 Geo. 3. c. 17 (I)	7 June 1766
An Act for encouraging the planting of Timber Trees.
Corn Preservation Act 1765 (repealed)	5 Geo. 3. c. 18 (I)	7 June 1766
An Act for the better preservation of Corn. (Repealed by Statute Law Revision (Ireland) Act 1879 (42 & 43 Vict. c. 24))
Tillage Encouragement Act 1765 (repealed)	5 Geo. 3. c. 19 (I)	7 June 1766
An Act for the further encouragement of Tillage in this Kingdom. (Repealed by Statute Law Revision (Ireland) Act 1879 (42 & 43 Vict. c. 24))
County Hospitals Act 1765^{(Republic of Ireland)}	5 Geo. 3. c. 20 (I)	7 June 1766
An Act for erecting and establishing Publick Infirmaries or Hospitals in this Kingdom.
Treason Act (Ireland) 1765	5 Geo. 3. c. 21 (I)	7 June 1766
An Act for the better regulating of trials in cases of high treason under the statute of the twenty fifth of Edward the third. (Note: Treason Act 1351 (25 Edw. 3 Stat. 5. c. 2 (Eng))) (Repealed for the Republic of Ireland by Statute Law Revision (Pre-Union Irish Statutes) Act 1962 (No. 29))
Local Government (Dublin and Drogheda) Act 1765^{(Republic of Ireland)}	5 Geo. 3. c. 22 (I)	7 June 1766
An Act for continuing and amending an Act, intitled, "An Act for the better regulating the Parish Watches, and amending Highways in this Kingdom, and for preventing the Misapplication of Publick Money; and also for establishing a regular Watch in the City of Dublin, and to prevent Mischief which may happen by graving in the River Liffey;" (Note: Parish Watches, Highways, and Dublin Watch Act 1723 (10 Geo. 1. c. 3 (I))) and also for regulating the Watch in the town of Drogheda.
Insolvent Debtors Relief Act 1765 (repealed)	5 Geo. 3. c. 23 (I)	7 June 1766
An Act for the Relief of Insolvent Debtors. (Repealed by Statute Law Revision (Ireland) Act 1879 (42 & 43 Vict. c. 24))
City of Cork Act 1765^{(Republic of Ireland)}	5 Geo. 3. c. 24 (I)	7 June 1766
An Act for altering and amending several Statutes heretofore made for the better Regulation of the City of Cork, and for regulating Trials by juries in the Court of Record of the said City; and for establishing Market furies in the said City; and for making wide and convenient Ways, Streets, and Passages in the said City and Suburbs thereof; and for preventing Frauds committed by the Bakers and Meal Makers of the said City.
Athlone to Mount Talbot Road Act 1765	5 Geo. 3. c. 25 (I)	7 June 1766
An Act for making a turnpike road from the town of Athlone in the county of Roscommon to the bridge of Balliforan on the river Suck, and from Athlone to the town of Mount Talbot in the county of Roscommon.
Monasterevin to Lahinch Road Act 1765	5 Geo. 3. c. 26 (I)	7 June 1766
An Act for making a turnpike road from the town of Monasterevan (Note: Monasterevin, County Kildare.) in the county of Kildare to the town of Portarlington, and from thence to the towns of Mountmellick and Rosenallis in Queen's County and from thence to the town of Birr in the King's County and from thence to Lahinch (Note: Lahinch, County Clare.) near the River Shannon in county of Tipperary.
Dundalk to Newry Road Act 1765	5 Geo. 3. c. 27 (I)	7 June 1766
An Act for the more effectually keeping in repair the road leading from the bridge of Dundalk in the county of Louth, through the lands of Forkhill to the bridge of Mowan, and from thence to the Newry turnpike road, near the eight mile stone, in the county of Armagh.
Dublin to Kildare Road Act 1765	5 Geo. 3. c. 28 (I)	7 June 1766
An Act for shortening, widening and repairing the turnpike roads leading from the city of Dublin (Note: Dublin.) to the town of Kildare, (Note: Kildare, County Kildare.) and to explain, amend and make more effectual an act made in the 20th year of his late majesty's reign (Note: Naas to Maryborough Road Act 1745 (19 Geo. 2. c. 20 (I))) entitled "An Act for the making more effectual an act passed in the 7th year of his late majesty (Note: Naas to Maryborough Road Act 1733 (7 Geo. 2. c. 17 (I))) entitled 'An Act for making more effectual an act passed in the 5th year of the reign of his late majesty King George II (Note: Naas to Maryborough Road Act 1731 (5 Geo. 2. c. 21 (I))) entitled "An Act for repairing the road leading from the town of Naas (Note: Naas, County Kildare.) in the county of Kildare to the town of Maryborough (Note: Portlaoise, County Laois.) in the Queen's County."'"

=== Private acts ===
Short title, or popular name	Citation	Royal assent
Long title
Pery's Estate Act 1765	5 Geo. 3. c. 1 Pr. (I)	20 March 1766
An Act to enable Edmond Sexten Pery, esquire, to make building leases of certain lands in the city of Limerick and in St Francis's Abbey, in the county of Limerick, and for other purposes.
Creagh's Estate Act 1765	5 Geo. 3. c. 2 Pr. (I)	7 June 1766
An Act to supply an omission in a settlement made on the intermarriage of Pierce Creagh of Dangan in the county of Clare, esquire, with Catharine Quinn, daughter of Valentine Quinn of Adair in the county of Limerick, esquire.
Lovett Ashe's Estate Act 1765	5 Geo. 3. c. 3 Pr. (I)	7 June 1766
An Act to confirm a settlement bearing date the 28th of August 1756, made in pursuance of articles entered into by Lovett Ashe, esquire, previous to his intermarriage with Waller Lloyd, and for other purposes.
Hamilton's Estate Act 1765	5 Geo. 3. c. 4 Pr. (I)	7 June 1766
An Act to explain and amend an act entitled "An Act for vesting in trustees the estates and advowson of Sir Francis Hamilton, late of Castle Hamilton, baronet, deceased, for payment of debts affecting the same, and to make partition of the residue thereof between the co-heirs of Arthur Cecil Hamilton, esquire, deceased, and for other purposes therein mentioned." (Note: Hamilton's Estate Act 1759 (33 Geo. 2. c. 2 Pr. (I)))
Archdall's Estate Act 1765	5 Geo. 3. c. 5 Pr. (I)	7 June 1766
An Act for enabling the executors of Nicholas Archdall, esquire, and others, to make building leases of certain grounds in the county of Dublin, devised and bequeathed to and for the use of his widow and his younger children.
Evans' Name and Arms Act 1765	5 Geo. 3. c. 6 Pr. (I)	7 June 1766
An Act for enabling John Evans, esquire, to assume and bear the name and arms of Freke, and in the lifetime of Grace, his mother, to settle a jointure upon the Right Honourable Lady Elizabeth Freke, his wife, and for other purposes.
	5 Geo. 3. c. 7 Pr. (I)	
Wilson's Creditors Act 1765	5 Geo. 3. c. 8 Pr. (I)	7 June 1766
An Act for the relief of the creditors of Ralph Warter Wilson and Edward Warter Wilson, esquires, deceased, and for the relief of Frances Juliana Warter Wilson, a minor, the heiress at law of the said Edward Warter Wilson.
White's Creditors Act 1765	5 Geo. 3. c. 9 Pr. (I)	7 June 1766
An Act for the relief of the creditors of Hugh White of the city of Dublin, merchant.

=== Sources ===
- "Acts of Parliament by Session: 1765". Irish Legislation Database. Queen's University Belfast.
- "Pre-Union Irish Statutes: 1765 Acts". Irish Statute Book. Attorney General of Ireland.

== 7 Geo. 3 (1767) ==
The 4th session of the 1st parliament of George III, which met from 20 October 1767 to 27 May 1768.

This session was also traditionally cited as 7 G. 3.

=== Public acts ===
Short title, or popular name	Citation	Royal assent
Long title
Additional Duties Act 1767 (repealed)	7 Geo. 3. c. 1 (I)	23 December 1767
An act for granting to his majesty an additional duty on beer, ale, strong waters, wine, tobacco, hides and other goods and merchandises therein mentioned, and for prohibiting the importation of all gold and silver lace, and of all cambrics and lawns, except of the manufacture of Great Britain. (Repealed by Statute Law Revision (Ireland) Act 1879 (42 & 43 Vict. c. 24))
Loan Duties Act 1767 (repealed)	7 Geo. 3. c. 2 (I)	23 December 1767
An act for granting to his majesty the several duties, rates, impositions and taxes therein expressed to be applied to the payment of the interest of the sums therein provided for, and towards the discharge of the said principal sums, in such a manner as therein directed. (Repealed by Statute Law Revision (Ireland) Act 1879 (42 & 43 Vict. c. 24))
Octennial Act 1767 (repealed)	7 Geo. 3. c. 3 (I)	16 February 1768
An act for limiting the duration of parliaments. (Repealed by Statute Law Revision (Ireland) Act 1879 (42 & 43 Vict. c. 24))
County Buildings Rent Act 1767	7 Geo. 3. c. 4 (I)	12 May 1768
An Act to enable Grand Juries to raise by presentment Money for discharging the Rents of Court-houses, Gaols, and Offices for keeping the Records of the respective Counties, and for other purposes.
Insolvent Debtors Relief Act 1767 (repealed)	7 Geo. 3. c. 5 (I)	12 May 1768
An Act to amend and explain an Act passed in the Sixth Year of His present Majesty's Reign intituled "An Act for the Relief of Insolvent Debtors." (Note: Insolvent Debtors Relief Act 1761 (1 Geo. 3. c. 16 (I))) (Repealed by Statute Law Revision (Ireland) Act 1879 (42 & 43 Vict. c. 24))
Barracks and Lighthouses Act 1767 (repealed)	7 Geo. 3. c. 6 (I)	12 May 1768
An Act to continue, amend and make more effectual an act passed in the 4th year of his late majesty King George I (Note: Barracks and Lighthouses Act 1717 (4 Geo. 1. c. 7 (I))) entitled "An Act for vesting in his majesty, his heirs and successors, the several lands, tenements and hereditaments, whereon the barracks in this kingdom are built, or building, or contracted for, and whereon lighthouses are, or shall be built, and for making reasonable satisfaction to the several owners and proprietors for the same," and also an act passed in the 21st year of the reign of his late majesty King George II (Note: Barracks and Lighthouses Act 1747 (21 Geo. 2. c. 9 (I))) entitled "An Act for amending and making more effectual the said former act, and likewise to enable the present commissioners of the barrack board and their successors to sell the several estates in the lands whereon barracks have been built, that are now gone to decay, or shall hereafter become useless, and also to sell the materials of such decayed barracks. (Repealed by Statute Law Revision (Ireland) Act 1879 (42 & 43 Vict. c. 24))
Parliament Street Act 1767	7 Geo. 3. c. 7 (I)	12 May 1768
An Act for further amending an act passed in the 31st year of the reign of his late majesty King George II, entitled "An Act for making a wide and convenient way, street and passage from Essex Bridge to the Castle of Dublin, and for other purposes therein mentioned." (Note: Parliament Street Act 1757 (31 Geo. 2. c. 19 (I)))
County Hospitals (Amendment) Act 1767^{(Republic of Ireland)}	7 Geo. 3. c. 8 (I)	12 May 1768
An Act to amend an Act, made the last Session of Parliament (Note: County Hospitals Act 1765 (5 Geo. 3. c. 20 (I))) for the erecting and establishing Publick Infirmaries or Hospitals in this Kingdom.
Union and Division of Parishes Act 1767	7 Geo. 3. c. 9 (I)	12 May 1768
An Act for explaining and amending an Act passed in the Second Year of His Majesty King George the First entitled "An Act for the real Union and Division of Parishes, and for other purposes therein mentioned." (Note: Parish Union and Division Act 1715 (2 Geo. 1. c. 14 (I)))
Cork to Killarney Roads and Gads Act 1767	7 Geo. 3. c. 10 (I)	12 May 1768
An Act to explain and amend an act made in the 21st year of his late majesty's reign entitled "An Act for repairing the road leading from the city of Cork (Note: Cork, County Cork.) through Millstreet (Note: Millstreet, County Cork.) to Shanah-Mill (Note: Shinnagh Mill, County Kerry.) in the county of Kerry, and from Shanah-Mill to Killarney, (Note: Killarney, County Kerry.) as also from Shanah-Mill, through Castleisland, (Note: Castleisland, County Kerry.) to Listowel (Note: Listowel, County Kerry.) in the said county, and for laying an additional toll at all turnpikes in this kingdom on all cars and carriages making use of any part of any saplin or trees as or for any bow or back band, or making use of any saplins twisted into gads for back bands, halters, traces to draw by, or gads commonly called long gads." (Note: Cork to Killarney Roads and Gads Act 1747 (21 Geo. 2. c. 13 (I)))
Listowel to Limerick Road Act 1767	7 Geo. 3. c. 11 (I)	12 May 1768
An Act for making and repairing the road from the town of Listowel in the county of Kerry, through the lands of Listowel, Drumin, Skehanireen, Bunegarah, Kilmeany, Curaghpholig, Knockenure, Lissenisky and Binanaspig in the county of Kerry, Atea, Taumpletlea, Glannagour, Knockfinisk, Carrigkerry, Glanduff, Glanasture, Ballyline, Ardagh commons, Ardagh town, Liskilleen, otherwise Liskireen, Skehana, Killscannell and Reens in the county of Limerick, ending at the forge on the said lands of Reens, at the turn of the road leading to Newcastle from Rathkeal in the said county of Limerick.
Dublin Corn and Flour Supply Act 1767 (repealed)	7 Geo. 3. c. 12 (I)	12 May 1768
An Act to explain and amend the Laws made for the better supplying the City of Dublin with Com and Flour. (Repealed by Statute Law Revision (Ireland) Act 1879 (42 & 43 Vict. c. 24))
Banbridge to Randalstown Road Act 1767	7 Geo. 3. c. 13 (I)	12 May 1768
An Act to alter, amend and explain an act made in the 9th year of his late majesty entitled "An Act for repairing the road leading from the bridge commonly called Banbridge (Note: Banbridge, County Down.) over the Banwater in the county of Down, to Randalstown (Note: Randalstown, County Antrim.) in the county of Antrim." (Note: Banbridge to Randalstown Road Act 1735 (9 Geo. 2. c. 17 (I)))
Marching Soldiers Act 1767 (repealed)	7 Geo. 3. c. 14 (I)	12 May 1768
An Act for the further explaining and amending an Act entitled "An Act to prevent the Disorders that may happen by the Marching of Soldiers; and for providing Carriages for the Baggage of Soldiers in their March." (Note: Marching Soldiers Act 1707 (6 Anne c. 14 (I))) (Repealed by Statute Law Revision (Ireland) Act 1879 (42 & 43 Vict. c. 24))
Dublin Society Act 1767	7 Geo. 3. c. 15 (I)	12 May 1768
An Act for directing the application of the Sum of Seven thousand Pounds granted to the Dublin Society for the encouragement of such Trades and Manufactures as should be directed by Parliament.
Qualification Indemnity Act 1767 (repealed)	7 Geo. 3. c. 16 (I)	12 May 1768
An Act for allowing further Time to Persons in Offices or Employments to qualify themselves pursuant to an Act intitled "An Act to prevent the further growth of Popery." (Note: Popery Act 1703 (2 Anne c. 6 (I))) (Repealed by Statute Law Revision (Ireland) Act 1879 (42 & 43 Vict. c. 24))
Armagh Chapels of Ease Act 1767	7 Geo. 3. c. 17 (I)	12 May 1768
An Act for erecting new chapels of ease in the parish of Armagh and making such chapels, and those that are already erected in the said parish, perpetual cures, and for making a proper provision for the maintenance of perpetual curates to officiate in the same.
Desbrisay's Creditors Act 1767	7 Geo. 3. c. 18 (I)	12 May 1768
An Act for the relief of the creditors of Theophilus Desbrisay of the city of Dublin.
Hawkers and Pedlars Act 1767 (repealed)	7 Geo. 3. c. 19 (I)	27 May 1768
An Act for licensing Hawkers and Pedlars, and for encouragement of English Protestant Schools. (Repealed by Statute Law Revision (Ireland) Act 1879 (42 & 43 Vict. c. 24))
Timber Act 1767^{(Republic of Ireland)}	7 Geo. 3. c. 20 (I)	27 May 1768
An Act for continuing, reviving, and amending several Temporary Statutes, and other Purposes therein mentioned.
Tithes Act 1767 (repealed)	7 Geo. 3. c. 21 (I)	27 May 1768
An Act to continue and amend an Act passed in the Third Year of His Majesty's Reign (Note: Tithes Act 1763 (3 Geo. 3. c. 25 (I))) entitled "An Act to amend and explain an Act made in the Thirty-third Year of the Reign of Henry the Eighth (Note: Tithes Act 1542 (33 Hen. 8. c. 12 (I))) entitled 'An Act for Tythes,' and for other purposes therein mentioned." (Repealed by Statute Law Revision (Ireland) Act 1879 (42 & 43 Vict. c. 24))
Royal Exchange Act 1767	7 Geo. 3. c. 22 (I)	27 May 1768
An Act for promoting the trade of Ireland, by enabling the merchants thereof to erect an exchange in the city of Dublin.
Woods and Timber Trees Act 1767 (repealed)	7 Geo. 3. c. 23 (I)	27 May 1768
An Act for the further preservation of woods and timber trees. (Repealed by Criminal Statutes (Ireland) Repeal Act 1828 (9 Geo. 4. c. 53))
Tillage and Navigation Bounties Act 1767 (repealed)	7 Geo. 3. c. 24 (I)	27 May 1768
An Act for the encouragement of Tillage and Navigation by granting a Bounty on the carriage of Corn coastways. (Repealed by Statute Law Revision (Ireland) Act 1879 (42 & 43 Vict. c. 24))
Insolvent Debtors Relief (No. 2) Act 1767	7 Geo. 3. c. 25 (I)	27 May 1768
An Act for the relief of debtors with respect to the imprisonment of their persons.
Limerick Navigation Act 1767^{(Republic of Ireland)}	7 Geo. 3. c. 26 (I)	27 May 1768
An Act for applying the Sum of Six Thousand Pounds, granted by Parliament to the Corporation for promoting and carrying on an inland Navigation in this Kingdom, to be by them applied in carrying on a Navigation from the City of Limerick to the deep navigable Water above the Town of Killaloe, and for encouraging other Persons to subscribe for carrying on and compleating the said Work at their own Expence.
Revenue Laws Act 1767 (repealed)	7 Geo. 3. c. 27 (I)	27 May 1768
An Act for the further improvement of His Majesty's Revenue, and for continuing and amending several Acts therein particularly mentioned. (Repealed by Statute Law Revision (Ireland) Act 1879 (42 & 43 Vict. c. 24))
Corn Preservation Act 1767 (repealed)	7 Geo. 3. c. 28 (I)	27 May 1768
An Act to amend an Act (Note: Corn Preservation Act 1765 (5 Geo. 3. c. 18 (I))) made for the better preservation of Corn. (Repealed by Statute Law Revision (Ireland) Act 1879 (42 & 43 Vict. c. 24))

=== Private acts ===
Short title, or popular name	Citation	Royal assent
Long title
Riall's Divorce Act 1767	7 Geo. 3. c. 1 Pr. (I)	12 May 1768
An Act to dissolve the marriage of Phineas Riall with Mary Riall, otherwise Bolton, his now wife, and to enable him to marry again, and for other purposes therein mentioned.
Nugent and O'Connor Estate Partition Act 1767	7 Geo. 3. c. 2 Pr. (I)	12 May 1768
An Act for confirming a partition made of part, and for making a final partition of other part of the estate of the Honourable Edmund Nugent and Maurice O'Connor, eldest son of John O'Connor, esquire, a minor under the age of 21 years, and for vesting part of the estate of the said Maurice O'Connor in trustees, to be sold for the payment of debts affecting the same, and for other purposes.
Croker's Estate Act 1767	7 Geo. 3. c. 3 Pr. (I)	12 May 1768
An Act to enable John Croker, esquire, to charge certain lands in the county of Limerick with a certain sum of money for portions for his younger children.
Waddell's Divorce Act 1767	7 Geo. 3. c. 4 Pr. (I)	12 May 1768
An Act to dissolve the marriage of James Waddell, esquire, with Letitia Freeman, his now wife, and to enable him to marry again, and for other purposes therein mentioned.
Earl of Drogheda's Estate Act 1767	7 Geo. 3. c. 5 Pr. (I)	27 May 1768
An Act for vesting the estate whereof the Right Honourable Edward, late earl of Drogheda, died seised in fee simple in trustees, to raise by sale of a competent part thereof money sufficient discharge his debts and legacies, and other encumbrances affecting the same.
Gore and Earl of Arran's Agreement Act 1767	7 Geo. 3. c. 6 Pr. (I)	27 May 1768
An Act for confirming a certain agreement between Francis Gore of Derrymore, otherwise called Goodwood, in the county of Clare, esquire, and the Right Honourable Arthur, earl of Arran, and the Right Honourable John, Lord Baron Annaly of Tennelick, and for the more effectual security and immediate payment of the debts of the said Francis Gore, and for appointing maintenances for the said Francis Gore, Ann Gore, otherwise Lewis, his wife, and their children, and for other purposes.
Green and Barry Families Estate Act 1767	7 Geo. 3. c. 7 Pr. (I)	27 May 1768
An Act for confirming and establishing an agreement made between William Green, esquire, Letitia Green, spinster, James Barry, esquire, Elizabeth Barry, otherwise Green, his wife, concerning the family estates of the said William, Letitia and Elizabeth, and for making the said agreement effectual, and for other purposes.
Forde's Creditors Act 1767	7 Geo. 3. c. 8 Pr. (I)	27 May 1768
An Act for the relief of Richard Thwaites and Samuel Boursiquot of the city of Dublin, public notaries, and other creditors of Nicholas Forde of the said city of Dublin, late merchant, and for other purposes therein mentioned.

=== Sources ===
- "Acts of Parliament by Session: 1767". Irish Legislation Database. Queen's University Belfast.
- "Pre-Union Irish Statutes: 1767 Acts". Irish Statute Book. Attorney General of Ireland.

== 9 Geo. 3 (1769) ==
The 1st session of the 2nd parliament of George III, which met from 17 October 1769 to 26 December 1769.

This session was also traditionally cited as 9 G. 3.

No private acts were passed in this session.

=== Public acts ===
Short title, or popular name	Citation	Royal assent
Long title
Additional Duties Act 1769 (repealed)	9 Geo. 3. c. 1 (I)	26 December 1769
An Act for granting unto his majesty an additional duty on beer, ale, strong waters, wine, tobacco, hides and other goods and merchandises therein mentioned, and for prohibiting the importation of all gold and silver lace, and of all cambrics and lawns, except of the manufacture of Great Britain. (Repealed by Statute Law Revision (Ireland) Act 1879 (42 & 43 Vict. c. 24))
Loan Duties Act 1769 (repealed)	9 Geo. 3. c. 2 (I)	26 December 1769
An Act for granting to his majesty the several duties, rates, impositions and taxes therein particularly expressed, to be applied to the payment of the interest of the sums therein provided for, and towards the discharge of the said principal sums, in such manner as therein is directed. (Repealed by Statute Law Revision (Ireland) Act 1879 (42 & 43 Vict. c. 24))

=== Sources ===
- "Acts of Parliament by Session: 1769". Irish Legislation Database. Queen's University Belfast.

== 11 Geo. 3 (1770) ==
The 2nd session of the 2nd parliament of George III, which met from 28 February 1771 to 18 May 1771.

This session was also traditionally cited as 11 G. 3.

=== Public acts ===
Short title, or popular name	Citation	Royal assent
Long title
Expiring Laws Continuance Act 1770 (repealed)	11 Geo. 3. c. 1 (I)	18 May 1771
An Act for reviving, continuing and amending several temporary statutes. (Repealed by Statute Law Revision (Ireland) Act 1879 (42 & 43 Vict. c. 24))
Expiring Laws Continuance (No. 2) Act 1770 (repealed)	11 Geo. 3. c. 2 (I)	18 May 1771
An Act for reviving continuing, and amending several temporary statutes, and for other purposes. (Repealed by Statute Law Revision (Ireland) Act 1879 (42 & 43 Vict. c. 24))
Qualification Indemnity Act 1770 (repealed)	11 Geo. 3. c. 3 (I)	18 May 1771
An Act for allowing further time to persons in offices or employments, to qualify themselves pursuant to an act, intituled, "An Act to prevent the further growth of popery." (Note: Popery Act 1703 (2 Anne c. 6 (I))) (Repealed by Statute Law Revision (Ireland) Act 1879 (42 & 43 Vict. c. 24))
Public Works Application Act 1770 (repealed)	11 Geo. 3. c. 4 (I)	18 May 1771
An Act for directing the application of the sum of twenty eight thousand eight hundred pounds granted the last session of parliament, to be applied to such publick works, and other purposes as should be directed by parliament. (Repealed by Statute Law Revision (Ireland) Act 1879 (42 & 43 Vict. c. 24))
Dublin Coal Price Act 1770 (repealed)	11 Geo. 3. c. 5 (I)	18 May 1771
An Act to prevent combinations to raise the price of coals in the city of Dublin. (Repealed by Statute Law Revision (Ireland) Act 1879 (42 & 43 Vict. c. 24))
Burning of Bricks (Dublin) Act 1770^{(Republic of Ireland)}	11 Geo. 3. c. 6 (I)	18 May 1771
An act to prevent the pernicious practice of burning bricks within the city of Dublin, or the neighbourhood thereof.
Obstruction of Trade Act 1770^{(Republic of Ireland)}	11 Geo. 3. c. 7 (I)	18 May 1771
An Act for punishing such persons as shall do injuries and violences to the persons or properties of his Majesty's subjects, with intent to hinder the exportation of corn. (Repealed for the Republic of Ireland by Statute Law Revision (Pre-Union Irish Statutes) Act 1962 (No. 29))
Insolvent Debtors Act 1770 (repealed)	11 Geo. 3. c. 8 (I)	18 May 1771
An Act to repeal an act, intituled, "An Act for the relief of debtors with respect to the imprisonment of their persons." (Note: Insolvent Debtors Relief (No. 2) Act 1767 (7 Geo. 3. c. 25 (I))) (Repealed by Statute Law Revision (Ireland) Act 1879 (42 & 43 Vict. c. 24))
Highways Act 1770	11 Geo. 3. c. 9 (I)	18 May 1771
An Act to explain and amend an act passed in the fifth year of his Majesty king George the third, intituled, "An Act for amending the publick roads." (Note: Roads Act 1765 (5 Geo. 3. c. 14 (I)))
Writs During Recess Act 1770 (repealed)	11 Geo. 3. c. 10 (I)	18 May 1771
An Act to enable the speaker of the house of commons to issue his warrants to make out new writs for the choice of members to serve in parliament in the room of such members, as shall die during the recess of parliament. (Repealed by Statute Law Revision (Ireland) Act 1879 (42 & 43 Vict. c. 24))
Quarantine Act 1770 (repealed)	11 Geo. 3. c. 11 (I)	18 May 1771
An Act to oblige ships more effectually to perform their quarantine and for the better preventing the plague being brought from foreign parts into Ireland and to hinder the spreading of infection. (Repealed by Statute Law Revision (Ireland) Act 1879 (42 & 43 Vict. c. 24))
Controverted Elections Act 1770	11 Geo. 3. c. 12 (I)	18 May 1771
An Act to regulate the trials of controverted elections or returns of members to serve in parliament.
Revenue Laws Act 1770 (repealed)	11 Geo. 3. c. 13 (I)	18 May 1771
An Act for continuing certain laws heretofore made for the improvement of his Majesty's Revenue, and the more effectual prevention of frauds therein. (Repealed by Statute Law Revision (Ireland) Act 1879 (42 & 43 Vict. c. 24))

=== Private acts ===
Short title, or popular name	Citation	Royal assent
Long title
Earl of Shannon's Estate Act 1771 (repealed)	11 Geo. 3. c. 1 Pr. (I)	18 May 1771
An Act for vesting in trustees, for the purposes therein mentioned, part of the estates settled on the marriage of the Right Honourable Richard, earl of Shannon, and for settling other estates in lieu thereof.

=== Sources ===
- "Acts of Parliament by Session: 1771A". Irish Legislation Database. Queen's University Belfast.

== See also ==
- List of acts of the Parliament of Ireland
- List of acts of the Oireachtas
- List of legislation in the United Kingdom
