= List of acts of the Parliament of Ireland, 1751–1760 =

This is a list of acts of the Parliament of Ireland for the years from 1751 to 1760.

The number shown by each act's title is its chapter number. Acts are cited using this number, preceded by the years of the reign during which the relevant parliamentary session was held; thus the act concerning assay passed in 1783 is cited as "23 & 24 Geo. 3. c. 23", meaning the 23rd act passed during the session that started in the 23rd year of the reign of George III and which finished in the 24th year of that reign. The modern convention is to use Arabic numerals in citations (thus "40 Geo. 3" rather than "40 Geo. III"). Acts of the reign of Elizabeth I are formally cited without a regnal numeral in the Republic of Ireland.

Acts passed by the Parliament of Ireland did not have a short title; however, some of these acts have subsequently been given a short title by acts of the Parliament of the United Kingdom, acts of the Parliament of Northern Ireland, or acts of the Oireachtas. This means that some acts have different short titles in the Republic of Ireland and Northern Ireland respectively. Official short titles are indicated by the flags of the respective jurisdictions.

A number of the acts included in this list are still in force in Northern Ireland or the Republic of Ireland. Because these two jurisdictions are entirely separate, the version of an act in force in one may differ from the version in force in the other; similarly, an act may have been repealed in one but not in the other.

A number of acts passed by the Parliament of Great Britain also extended to Ireland during this period.

== 25 Geo. 2 (1751) ==
The 13th session of the parliament of George II, which met from 8 October 1751 to 7 May 1752.

This session was also traditionally cited as 25 G. 2.

=== Public acts ===
Short title, or popular name	Citation	Royal assent
Long title
Import Duties and Prohibitions Act 1751 (repealed)	25 Geo. 2. c. 1 (I)	19 December 1751
An Act for granting and continuing to his Majesty an additional duty on beer, ale, strong waters, wine, tobacco, hides, and other goods and merchandizes therein mentioned; and for prohibiting the importation of all gold and silver lace, except of the manufacture of Great Britain. (Repealed by Statute Law Revision (Ireland) Act 1879 (42 & 43 Vict. c. 24))
National Debt and Taxation Act 1751 (repealed)	25 Geo. 2. c. 2 (I)	19 December 1751
An Act for payment of the principal sum of one hundred and twenty thousand pounds in discharge of so much of the national debt; and for granting to his Majesty an additional duty on wine, silk, hops, china, earthen, japanned, or lacquered ware, and vinegar; and also a tax of four shillings in the pound on all salaries, profits of employments, fees, and pensions; to be applied to discharge the interest of the said principal sum, until the same shall be paid; and also to pay an interest of four pounds per centum per annum for the sum of one hundred and seventeen thousand five hundred pounds, which will remain due after payment of the said sum of one hundred and twenty thousand pounds, and towards the discharge of the said sum of one hundred and seventeen thousand five hundred pounds, or so much thereof as shall remain due on the twenty fifth day of December one thousand seven hundred and fifty one. (Repealed by Statute Law Revision (Ireland) Act 1879 (42 & 43 Vict. c. 24))
Parliamentary Continuance Act 1751 (repealed)	25 Geo. 2. c. 3 (I)	7 March 1752
An Act to continue the Parliament for three years, whensoever and as often as the crown shall descend to any of the children of his late royal highness, Frederick Prince of Wales, being under the age of eighteen years, unless it shall be dissolved before that time. (Repealed by Statute Law Revision (Ireland) Act 1879 (42 & 43 Vict. c. 24))
Hawkers and Pedlars (Ireland) Act 1751 (repealed)	25 Geo. 2. c. 4 (I)	7 March 1752
An Act for licensing hawkers and pedlars; and for the encouragement of English protestant schools. (Repealed by Statute Law Revision (Ireland) Act 1879 (42 & 43 Vict. c. 24))
Game Act 1751 (repealed)	25 Geo. 2. c. 5 (I)	7 March 1752
An Act for the better preservation of the game. (Repealed by Statute Law Revision (Ireland) Act 1879 (42 & 43 Vict. c. 24))
Expiring Laws Continuance Act 1751 (repealed)	25 Geo. 2. c. 6 (I)	7 March 1752
An Act for continuing several temporary statutes now near expiring. (Repealed by Statute Law Revision (Ireland) Act 1879 (42 & 43 Vict. c. 24))
Popery Act 1751 (repealed)	25 Geo. 2. c. 7 (I)	7 March 1752
An Act for allowing further time to persons in offices or employments to qualify themselves pursuant to an act, intituled, "An Act to prevent the further growth of popery." (Note: Popery Act 1703 (2 Anne c. 6 (I))) (Repealed by Statute Law Revision (Ireland) Act 1879 (42 & 43 Vict. c. 24))
Apprentices Act 1751^{(Republic of Ireland)}	25 Geo. 2. c. 8 (I)	7 March 1752
An Act for the better adjusting and more easy recovery of the wages of certain servants, and for the better regulation of such servants, and of certain apprentices; and for the punishment of all such owners of coal, and their agents, as shall knowingly employ and set at work persons retained in the service of other coal-owners; and also that mutual debts between party and party be set one against the other.
Revenue and Frauds Act 1751	25 Geo. 2. c. 9 (I)	7 May 1752
An Act for continuing and amending several laws heretofore made relating to his Majesty's revenue, and for the more effectual preventing of frauds in his Majesty's customs and excise.
Tillage and Bogs Improvement Act 1751 (repealed)	25 Geo. 2. c. 10 (I)	7 May 1752
An Act for amending an act, (Note: Tillage, Bogs, Duties, and Wool Export Act 1729 (3 Geo. 2. c. 3 (I))) intituled, "An act for encouragement of tillage, and better employment of the poor; and also for the more effectual putting in execution an act, (Note: Bogs Draining and Inland Carriage Act 1715 (2 Geo. 1. c. 12 (I))) intituled, 'An act to encourage the draining and improving of bogs and unprofitable low grounds; and for easing and dispatching the inland carriage, and conveyance of goods from one part to another in this kingdom;' and also for laying several duties upon coaches, berlins, chariots, calashes, chaises, and chairs, and upon cards and dice, and upon wrought and manufactured gold and silver plate, imported into or made in Ireland, for the purposes therein mentioned; and also for repealing the duties payable upon the exportation of wool, bay yarn, and woollen yarn, out of this kingdom for England." (Repealed by Statute Law Revision (Ireland) Act 1879 (42 & 43 Vict. c. 24))
Wills Attestation Act 1751	25 Geo. 2. c. 11 (I)	7 May 1752
An Act for avoiding and putting an end to certain doubts and questions, relating to the attestation of wills and codicils concerning real estates.
Enforcement of Court Orders Act 1751^{(Republic of Ireland)}	25 Geo. 2. c. 12 (I)	7 May 1752
An Act to prevent unlawful Combination of Tenants, Colliers, Miners, and others; and the sending of threatening Letters without Names, or with fictitious Names subscribed thereto; and the malicious Destruction of Carriages; and for the more effectual Punishment of wicked Persons, who shall maliciously set fire to Houses or Out-houses; or to Stacks of Hay, Corn, Straw, or Turf; or to Ships or Boats.
Distress for Rent Act 1751^{(Republic of Ireland)}	25 Geo. 2. c. 13 (I)	7 May 1752
An Act for explaining amending, and making more effectual the Laws relating to Landlord and Tenant.
Judgments and Rents Act 1751 (repealed)	25 Geo. 2. c. 14 (I)	7 May 1752
An Act to explain and amend an act passed in the ninth year of the reign of his present Majesty, intituled, An act for the more effectual assignment of judgments, and for the more speedy recovery of rents by distress; (Note: Judgments Assignment and Rents Recovery Act 1735 (9 Geo. 2. c. 5 (I))) so far as the said act relates to the assignment of judgments and statutes, and to prevent great in conveniences that frequently happen to the suitors of the court of Chancery, by the death or removal of a six clerk or six clerks of the said court, and to enable grand juries to make presentments for the clerks of the crown and peace. (Repealed by Statute Law Revision (Ireland) Act 1879 (42 & 43 Vict. c. 24))
Weights and Measures Act 1751^{(Republic of Ireland)}	25 Geo. 2. c. 15 (I)	7 May 1752
An Act for the buying and selling of all sorts of corn and meal, and other things therein mentioned, by weight; and for the more effectual preventing the frauds committed in the buying and selling thereof.
Dublin Workhouse and Hackney Coaches Act 1751 (repealed)	25 Geo. 2. c. 16 (I)	1 May 1752
An Act for explaining and amending the several laws now in being relating to the work-house of the city of Dublin; so far as the same relates to the rates of hackney coaches and hackney coachmen, and sedan chairs and chairmen in and about the said city. (Repealed by Statute Law Revision (Ireland) Act 1879 (42 & 43 Vict. c. 24))
Clonmel to Urlingford Road Act 1751	25 Geo. 2. c. 17 (I)	1 May 1752
An Act for repairing the road leading from the town of Clonmell (Note: Clonmel, County Tipperary.) in the county of Tipperary through the town of Feathard (Note: Fethard, County Tipperary.) and Killnall (Note: Killenaule, County Tipperary.) in the said county, to the town of Hurlingford (Note: Urlingford, County Kilkenny.) in the county of Kilkenny.
Mountrath to Clonefin Road Act 1751	25 Geo. 2. c. 18 (I)	1 May 1752
An Act for making and repairing the road leading from the town of Mountrath (Note: Mountrath, County Laois.) in the Queen's county through the towns and lands of Litter, Frankford, (Note: Kilcormac, County Offaly.) Galrus, and Cloniver, in the King's county, to the town and lands of Clonefin in the said county.
Athy to Leighlinbridge Road Act 1751 (repealed)	25 Geo. 2. c. 19 (I)	1 May 1752
An Act for making and repairing the road leading from the town of Athy (Note: Athy, County Kildare.) in the county of Kildare through part of the Queen's county, and through the town of Castlecomer (Note: Castlecomer, County Kilkenny.) in the county of Kilkenny, to the town of Old Leighlin (Note: Old Leighlin, County Carlow.) in the county of Carlow, and from thence to and through the town of Leighlin Bridge (Note: Leighlinbridge, County Carlow.) in the said county of Carlow. (Repealed by Athy and Leighlin Bridge, and Carlow and Castlecomer Roads Act 1808 (48 Geo. 3. c. lv))
Ballinagar to Clane Road Act 1751	25 Geo. 2. c. 20 (I)	7 May 1752
An Act for making and keeping in repair a road from the town of Ballynagarr (Note: Ballinagar, County Offaly.) in the King's county through the Bogg of Allen (Note: Bog of Allen.) and lands adjacent to the town of Clane (Note: Clane, County Kildare.) in the county of Kildare.
Kilkenny to Clonmel Road Act 1751	25 Geo. 2. c. 21 (I)	7 May 1752
An Act for the more effectual repairing and amending the road, leading from the city of Kilkenny (Note: Kilkenny, County Kilkenny.) to the town of Clonmel (Note: Clonmel, County Tipperary.) in the county of Tipperary, and for discharging the said road from all incumbrances by fraud affecting the same; and for the relief of Richard Gore esq; and Anne his wife, administratrix of William Gore esq; deceased; and of John Wallis esq; administrator with the will annexed of Henry Wallis esq; deceased.
Burton's Bank Creditors Act 1751	25 Geo. 2. c. 22 (I)	7 May 1752
An Act for the more effectual carrying into execution an act, intituled, "An Act for the relief of the creditors of the bank lately kept by Samuel Burton and Daniel Falkiner; and of the creditors of the bank lately kept by Benjamin Burton, Samuel Burton, and Daniel Falkiner; and of the creditors of the bank lately kept by Benjamin Burton and Samuel Burton; and of the creditors of the bank lately kept by Benjamin Burton and Francis Harrison, (Note: Burton's and Falkiner's Bank Creditors Act 1733 (7 Geo. 2. c. 26 (I))) by taking away the benefit of pleading the statutes of limitations from the several debtors to the said several banks and to the said several bankers; and to enable the said creditors to make composition for their several debts.
Cork Infirmary Act 1751^{(Republic of Ireland)}	25 Geo. 2. c. 23 (I)	1 May 1752
An Act for establishing an infirmary in the city of Cork, and to vest the house called the Infirmary-House and the back-yard thereunto belonging, which is built at the east end of the church-yard of saint Mary Shandon, otherwise saint Ann's, in the liberties of the city of Cork, in certain trustees for ever, and to give such trustees such powers as may be necessary to promote and execute the purposes of an infirmary in the city of Cork; and for uniting several small parishes in the suburbs of the said city.

=== Private acts ===
Short title, or popular name	Citation	Royal assent
Long title
Diocese of Kilmore Estate Act 1751	25 Geo. 2. c. 1 Pr. (I)	1 May 1752
An Act to enable the Right Reverend Father in God, Joseph Lord bishop of Kilmore, and his successors, to exchange certain lands belonging to said see, with William Gore, of Woodford, esquire.
Fitzherbert's Estate Act 1751	25 Geo. 2. c. 2 Pr. (I)	1 May 1752
An Act for vesting certain manors, lands, and hereditaments in this kingdom, the estate of Andrew Fitzherbert, esquire, in trustees, in order that a competent part thereof may be sold, for the payment of debts and other encumbrances affecting the same, and for settling other lands in lieu of the lands to be sold.
Frend's Divorce Act 1751	25 Geo. 2. c. 3 Pr. (I)	1 May 1752
An Act to dissolve the marriage of George Frend, esquire, captain of a company of foot in the regiment commanded by the Honourable Colonel Waldegrave, with Elizabeth Vanluen, and to enable him to marry again, and for other purposes therein mentioned.
King's Inns Act 1751	25 Geo. 2. c. 4 Pr. (I)	7 May 1752
An Act for selling or leasing certain lands, houses and edifices, with their appurtenances, commonly called the King's Inns, situate in the county of the city of Dublin, for the purposes therein mentioned.

=== Sources ===
- "Acts of Parliament by Session: 1751". Irish Legislation Database. Queen's University Belfast.
- "Pre-Union Irish Statutes: 1751 Acts". Irish Statute Book. Attorney General of Ireland.

== 27 Geo. 2 (1753) ==
The 14th session of the parliament of George II, which met from 9 October 1753 to 15 January 1754.

This session was also traditionally cited as 27 G. 2.

There were no private acts passed in this session.

=== Public acts ===
Short title, or popular name	Citation	Royal assent
Long title
Duties on Beer, etc. Act 1753 (repealed)	27 Geo. 2. c. 1 (I)	22 December 1753
An Act for granting and continuing to his Majesty an additional duty on beer, ale, strong waters, wine, tobacco, hides, and other goods and merchandizes therein mentioned; and for prohibiting the importation of all gold and silver lace, except of the manufacture of Great Britain. (Repealed by Statute Law Revision (Ireland) Act 1879 (42 & 43 Vict. c. 24))
Flax and Hempen Manufactures Act 1753 (repealed)	27 Geo. 2. c. 2 (I)	22 December 1753
An Act for continuing altering and amending the laws in relation to the flaxen and hempen manufactures. (Repealed by Statute Law Revision (Ireland) Act 1879 (42 & 43 Vict. c. 24))
Lagan Navigation Act 1753	27 Geo. 2. c. 3 (I)	22 December 1753
An Act for making the river Lagan navigable, and opening passage by water between Lough-Neagh and the town of Belfast in the county of Antrim.

=== Sources ===
- "Acts of Parliament by Session: 1753". Irish Legislation Database. Queen's University Belfast.

== 29 Geo. 2 (1755) ==
The 15th session of the parliament of George II, which met from 7 October 1755 to 8 May 1756.

This session was also traditionally cited as 29 G. 2.

=== Public acts ===
Short title, or popular name	Citation	Royal assent
Long title
Duties on Beer, etc. Act 1755 (repealed)	29 Geo. 2. c. 1 (I)	20 December 1755
An Act for granting and continuing to his Majesty an additional duty on beer, ale, strong waters, wine, tobacco, hides, and other goods and merchandizes therein mentioned; and for prohibiting the importation of all gold and silver lace, except of the manufacture of Great Britain. (Repealed by Statute Law Revision (Ireland) Act 1879 (42 & 43 Vict. c. 24))
Popery Act 1755 (repealed)	29 Geo. 2. c. 2 (I)	20 December 1755
An Act for allowing further time to persons in offices or employments to qualify themselves pursuant to an act, intituled, "An Act to prevent the further growth of popery." (Note: Popery Act 1703 (2 Anne c. 6 (I))) (Repealed by Statute Law Revision (Ireland) Act 1879 (42 & 43 Vict. c. 24))
Revenue and Frauds Act 1755	29 Geo. 2. c. 3 (I)	8 May 1756
An Act for continuing and amending several laws heretofore made relating to his Majesty's revenue, and for the more effectual preventing of frauds in his Majesty's customs and excise.
Hawkers and Pedlars (Ireland) Act 1755 (repealed)	29 Geo. 2. c. 4 (I)	8 May 1756
An act for licensing Hawkers and Pedlars; and for the encouragement of English Protestant Schools. (Repealed by Statute Law Revision (Ireland) Act 1879 (42 & 43 Vict. c. 24))
French King's Service Prohibition Act 1755	29 Geo. 2. c. 5 (I)	8 May 1756
An Act to prohibit the Return into this Kingdom of such of his Majesty's Subjects as now are, or at any Time hereafter shall be, in the Service of the French King.
Juries Act 1755 (repealed)	29 Geo. 2. c. 6 (I)	8 May 1756
An Act for better regulating Juries. (Repealed by Statute Law Revision (Ireland) Act 1879 (42 & 43 Vict. c. 24))
Free-Schools and Churches Act 1755 (repealed)	29 Geo. 2. c. 7 (I)	8 May 1756
An Act for amending an act passed in the twelfth year of the reign of his late Majesty King George the first, intituled, "An Act for the more effectual erecting and better regulating of free-schools, and for rebuilding and repairing of churches." (Note: Free Schools and Churches Act 1725 (12 Geo. 1. c. 9 (I))) (Repealed by Statute Law Revision (Ireland) Act 1879 (42 & 43 Vict. c. 24))
Apprentices Act 1755^{(Republic of Ireland)}	29 Geo. 2. c. 8 (I)	8 May 1756
An Act for continuing and reviving several temporary statutes; and for amending and explaining an act made in the eighth year of his late Majesty's reign, (Note: Butter, Tallow, Hides, and Salmon Act 1721 (8 Geo. 1. c. 7 (I))) continued and amended by an act made in the twenty first year of his present Majesty's reign, (Note: Expiring Statutes Continuance (Ireland) Act 1747 (21 Geo. 2. c. 7 (I))) intituled, "An act for the further amendment of the law in relation to butter and tallow, casks, hides, and other commodities of this kingdom; and for preventing the destruction of salmon."
Tillage Act 1755 (repealed)	29 Geo. 2. c. 9 (I)	8 May 1756
An Act for the further encouragement of Tillage. (Repealed by Statute Law Revision (Ireland) Act 1879 (42 & 43 Vict. c. 24))
Tillage and Bogs Improvement (Amendment) Act 1755 (repealed)	29 Geo. 2. c. 10 (I)	8 May 1756
An Act for amending an act passed in the twenty fifth year of his present Majesty's reign, (Note: Tillage and Bogs Improvement Act 1751 (25 Geo. 2. c. 10 (I))) intituled, "An Act for amending an act, (Note: Tillage, Bogs, Duties, and Wool Export Act 1729 (3 Geo. 2. c. 3 (I))) intituled, 'An Act for encouragement of tillage, and better employment of the poor; and also for the more effectual putting in execution an act, (Note: Bogs Draining and Inland Carriage Act 1715 (2 Geo. 1. c. 12 (I))) intituled, "An act to encourage the draining and improving of bogs and unprofitable low grounds; and for easing and dispatching the inland carriage and conveyance of goods from one part to another in this kingdom;" and also for laying several duties upon coaches, berlins, chariots, calashes, chaises, and chairs, and upon cards and dice, and upon wrought and manufactured gold and silver plate, imported into or made in Ireland, for the purposes therein mentioned;" and also for repealing the duties payable upon the exportation of wool, bay yarn, and woollen yarn, out of this kingdom for England.'" (Repealed by Statute Law Revision (Ireland) Act 1879 (42 & 43 Vict. c. 24))
Sale of Corn by Weight and Assize of Bread Act 1755	29 Geo. 2. c. 11 (I)	8 May 1756
An Act for reviving and amending an act passed in the eleventh year of his present Majesty, intituled, "An Act for buying and selling all sorts of corn, and meal, and other things therein mentioned, by weight; and for the more effectual preventing the frauds committed in the buying and selling thereof, and for regulating the price and assize of bread and for better regulating the market;" (Note: Corn, Meal, and Bread Regulation Act 1737 (11 Geo. 2. c. 11 (I))) as also one other act made in the nineteenth year of his said Majesty's reign, intituled, "An act for continuing and amending an act for buying and selling of all sorts of corn, and meal, and other things therein mentioned, by weight, and for the more effectual preventing the frauds committed in the buying and selling thereof, and for regulating the price and assize of bread and for better regulating the markets," (Note: Corn, Meal, and Bread Regulation Act 1745 (19 Geo. 2. c. 17 (I))) so far as the said acts relate to the regulating the price and assize of bread, and the better regulating the markets.
Unlawful Combinations and Arson Act 1755	29 Geo. 2. c. 12 (I)	8 May 1756
An Act to prevent unlawful Combination of Tenants, Colliers, Miners, and others; and the sending of threatening Letters without Names, or with fictitious Names subscribed thereto; and the malicious Destruction of Carriages; and for the more effectual Punishment of wicked Persons, who shall maliciously set fire to Houses or Out-houses; or to Stacks of Hay, Corn, Straw, or Turf; or to Ships or Boats. (Repealed for the Republic of Ireland by Statute Law Revision (Pre-Union Irish Statutes) Act 1962 (No. 29))
City of Dublin Act 1755	29 Geo. 2. c. 13 (I)	8 May 1756
An Act for making more effectual the several acts passed for repairing and amending the streets and highways in and about the city of Dublin.
Houses of Correction and Presentments Act 1755	29 Geo. 2. c. 14 (I)	8 May 1756
An Act for removing Doubts touching the Presentments of Money in the court of King's Bench, and for raising of Money for building and repairing Houses of Correction. (Repealed for the Republic of Ireland by Statute Law Revision (Pre-Union Irish Statutes) Act 1962 (No. 29))
Sheriffs Act 1755^{(Republic of Ireland)}	29 Geo. 2. c. 15 (I)	8 May 1756
An Act to supply the Defects of an Act passed in the eleventh Year of the Reign of her late Majesty Queen Anne, intituled, "An Act for explaining and amending several Statutes for prohibiting Under-Sheriffs and Sheriffs Clerks from officiating as Sub-Sheriffs or Sheriffs Clerks more than one Year." (Note: Sheriffs Act 1712 (11 Anne c. 8 (I)))
Public Credit Act 1755	29 Geo. 2. c. 16 (I)	8 May 1756
An Act for promoting publick credit.
Insolvent Debtors Relief Act 1755 (repealed)	29 Geo. 2. c. 17 (I)	8 May 1756
An Act for the Relief of Insolvent Debtors. (Repealed by Statute Law Revision (Ireland) Act 1879 (42 & 43 Vict. c. 24))
First-Fruits and Boulter's Bequest Act 1755 (repealed)	29 Geo. 2. c. 18 (I)	8 May 1756
An Act for amending and making more effectual the several laws relating to the first-fruits, payable out of the ecclesiastical benefices in this kingdom; and for the better regulation and management of the charitable bequest of Doctor Hugh Boulter, late lord archbishop of Armagh, for augmenting the maintenance of poor clergy in this kingdom. (Repealed by Church Temporalities (Ireland) Act 1833 (3 & 4 Will. 4. c. 37))
Mallow to Kilmeany Road Act 1755	29 Geo. 2. c. 19 (I)	8 May 1756
An Act for making and amending the road leading from the town of Mallow (Note: Mallow, County Cork.) in the county of Cork through the lands of Drumdown, (Note: Dromdowney, County Limerick.) Killmaclinin, (Note: Kilmaclenine, County Limerick.) and Lissgriffin, (Note: Lisgriffin, County Limerick.) to Newcastle (Note: Newcastle West, County Limerick.) in the county of Limerick, and from thence to the Fair-place of Glin (Note: Glin, County Limerick.) in the said county of Limerick, and from thence to Killmeany (Note: Kilmeany, County Kerry.) in the county of Kerry.
Clonmel to Doneraile Road Act 1755	29 Geo. 2. c. 20 (I)	8 May 1756
An Act to continue explain and amend an act, intituled, "An Act for amending and repairing the road, leading from the town of Clonmell (Note: Clonmel, County Tipperary.) in the county of Tipperary through the towns of Clogheen, (Note: Clogheen, County Cork.) Mitchelstown, (Note: Mitchelstown, County Cork.) and to Doneraile (Note: Doneraile, County Cork.) in the county of Cork;" (Note: Clonmel to Doneraile Road Act 1739 (13 Geo. 2. c. 15 (I))) and for discharging the said road from all leases affecting the same.
Lennox and French's Bank Creditors Act 1755	29 Geo. 2. c. 21 (I)	8 May 1756
An Act for the relief of the creditors of the bank lately kept by William Lennox and George French, of the city of Dublin; and of the bank lately kept by the said Willian Lennox.
Willcocks and Dawson's Bank Creditors Act 1755	29 Geo. 2. c. 22 (I)	8 May 1756
An Act for the relief of the creditors of the bank lately kept by John Willcocks and John Dawson, and of the creditors of the bank lately kept by Joseph Fade and John Willcocks, and of the creditors of the bank lately kept by Joseph Fade, Isachar Willcocks and John Willcocks, and of the creditors of the bank lately kept by Joseph Fade; and for raising out of the estates real and personal of Richard Brewer, late the cash keeper of the said John Willcocks and John Dawson, the sum due by the said Richard Brewer to the said John Willcocks and John Dawson.
Dillon's and Farrell Bank Creditors Act 1755	29 Geo. 2. c. 23 (I)	8 May 1756
An Act for relief of the creditors of the banks lately kept in the city of Dublin by Theobald Dillon and son; by Thomas Dillon, and company; and by Thomas Dillon, Richard Ferral, and company.
Protestant Dissenters Militia Act 1755 (repealed)	29 Geo. 2. c. 24 (I)	8 May 1756
An Act to make it lawful for his Majesty's protestant dissenting subjects of this kingdom to accept of and hold commissions in the militia, and to act in commission of array. (Repealed by Statute Law Revision (Ireland) Act 1879 (42 & 43 Vict. c. 24))

=== Private acts ===
Short title, or popular name	Citation	Royal assent
Long title
Quin's Estate Act 1755	29 Geo. 2. c. 1 Pr. (I)	8 May 1756
An Act for vesting the estates of Elizabeth Quin, otherwise Longfield, deceased, daughter and heiress of Dominick Quin, late of Quinsborough, in the county of Kildare, esquire, deceased, and also the estates of William Longfield, of the city of Dublin, esquire, and Robert Longfield, of Kilbride, in the county of Meath, esquire, in trustees, for sale of part thereof, for payment of the debts of the said Dominick Quin, Elizabeth Longfield otherwise Quin, and of the said William and Robert Longfield, esquires and of settling such parts of the said several estates as shall remain unsold, and for other purposes.
Tisdall's Estate Act 1755^{(Republic of Ireland)}	29 Geo. 2. c. 2 Pr. (I)	8 May 1756
An Act for sale of the manor or reputed manor of Mountfield in the Co. Tyrone, and of several lands and rents, parcel or reputed parcel of the said manor, for the uses mentioned in the settlement made previous to the intermarriage of James Tisdall the younger, esquire, with Rose McCausland.

=== Sources ===
- "Acts of Parliament by Session: 1755". Irish Legislation Database. Queen's University Belfast.
- "Pre-Union Irish Statutes: 1755 Acts". Irish Statute Book. Attorney General of Ireland.

== 31 Geo. 2 (1757) ==
The 16th session of the parliament of George II, which met from 11 October 1757 to 29 April 1758.

This session was also traditionally cited as 311 G. 2.

=== Public acts ===
Short title, or popular name	Citation	Royal assent
Long title
Duties on Beer, etc. Act 1757 (repealed)	31 Geo. 2. c. 1 (I)	7 December 1757
An Act for granting and continuing to his Majesty an additional duty on beer, ale, strong waters, wine, tobacco, hides, and other goods and merchandizes therein mentioned; and for prohibiting the importation of all gold and silver lace, except of the manufacture of Great Britain. (Repealed by Statute Law Revision (Ireland) Act 1879 (42 & 43 Vict. c. 24))
Spirits (Distilling Restriction) Act 1757 (repealed)	31 Geo. 2. c. 2 (I)	3 March 1758
An Act to prevent the distilling of spirits from wheat, oats, bear, barley, malt, beans, and pease, or from any potatoes, meal, or flour of wheat, oats, bear, barley, malt, beans, or pease, for a limited time. (Repealed by Statute Law Revision (Ireland) Act 1879 (42 & 43 Vict. c. 24))
Dublin Corn and Flour Supply Act 1757 (repealed)	31 Geo. 2. c. 3 (I)	3 March 1758
An Act for better supplying the city of Dublin with corn and flour. (Repealed by Statute Law Revision (Ireland) Act 1879 (42 & 43 Vict. c. 24))
Popery Act 1757 (repealed)	31 Geo. 2. c. 4 (I)	3 March 1758
An Act for allowing further time to persons in offices or employments to qualify themselves pursuant to an act, intituled, "An Act to prevent the further growth of popery." (Note: Popery Act 1703 (2 Anne c. 6 (I))) (Repealed by Statute Law Revision (Ireland) Act 1879 (42 & 43 Vict. c. 24))
Clonuff and Drumgath Parishes Union Dissolution Act 1757	31 Geo. 2. c. 5 (I)	3 March 1758
An Act for dissolving the union of the parishes of Clonuff and Drumgath in the diocese of Dromore.
Revenue and Frauds Act 1757 (repealed)	31 Geo. 2. c. 6 (I)	29 April 1758
An Act for continuing and amending several laws heretofore made relating to his Majesty's revenue, and for the more effectual preventing of frauds in his Majesty's customs and excise. (Repealed by Statute Law Revision (Ireland) Act 1879 (42 & 43 Vict. c. 24))
Hawkers and Pedlars (Ireland) Act 1757 (repealed)	31 Geo. 2. c. 7 (I)	29 April 1758
An Act for licensing Hawkers and Pedlars; and for encouragement of English Protestant Schools. (Repealed by Statute Law Revision (Ireland) Act 1879 (42 & 43 Vict. c. 24))
Salesmen and Graziers Act 1757 (repealed)	31 Geo. 2. c. 8 (I)	29 April 1758
An act to prohibit salesmen from being graziers, and to redress several abuses in buying and selling cattle and meat. (Repealed by Forestalling, Regrating, etc. Act 1844 (7 & 8 Vict. c. 24))
Expiring Laws Continuance Act 1757 (repealed)	31 Geo. 2. c. 9 (I)	29 April 1758
An Act for reviving, continuing, and amending several temporary Statutes. (Repealed by Statute Law Revision (Ireland) Act 1879 (42 & 43 Vict. c. 24))
Manufactures and Woollen Yarn Act 1757	31 Geo. 2. c. 10 (I)	29 April 1758
An Act for the more effectual preventing of frauds and abuses committed by persons employed in the manufacture of hats, and in the fustian, cotton, iron, furr, woollen, mohair, and silk manufactures of this kingdom; and for continuing and amending an act made in the seventh year of his present Majesty's reign, intituled, "An act to prevent frauds and abuses in bay-yarn exported to Great Britain." (Note: Spinners Act 1733 (7 Geo. 2. c. 9 (I)))
Clergy Residence Act 1757 (repealed)	31 Geo. 2. c. 11 (I)	29 April 1758
An Act more effectually to enable the clergy, having cure of souls, to reside upon their respective benefices, and to build upon their respective glebe lands. (Repealed by Statute Law Revision (Ireland) Act 1879 (42 & 43 Vict. c. 24))
Burton's Bank Creditors Act 1757	31 Geo. 2. c. 12 (I)	29 April 1758
An Act for the more effectual carrying into execution an act, intituled, "An Act for the relief of the creditors of the bank, lately kept by Samuel Burton and Daniel Falkiner; and of the creditors of the bank, lately kept by Benjamin Burton, Samuel Burton, and Daniel Falkiner; and of the creditors of the bank lately kept by Benjamin Burton and Samuel Burton; and of the creditors of the bank lately kept by Benjamin Burton and Francis Harrison." (Note: Burton's Bank Creditors Act 1733 (7 Geo. 2. c. 26 (I)))
Salmon and Herring Fisheries Act 1757 (repealed)	31 Geo. 2. c. 13 (I)	29 April 1758
An Act to explain and amend the several laws made in this kingdom, for the more effectual preservation of salmon, fish, and fry; and for the better improvement of the Herring-fishery. (Repealed by Fisheries (Ireland) Act 1842 (5 & 6 Vict. c. 106))
Collieries Act 1757 (repealed)	31 Geo. 2. c. 14 (I)	29 April 1758
An Act for the better supplying the City of Dublin with Coals, and for the better encouragement of the Collieries of this Kingdom. (Repealed by Statute Law Revision (Ireland) Act 1879 (42 & 43 Vict. c. 24))
Coals (Unlawful Combinations) Act 1757	31 Geo. 2. c. 15 (I)	29 April 1758
An Act to prevent unlawful combinations to raise the price of coals in the city of Dublin.
Dublin Small Debts Recovery Act 1757 (repealed)	31 Geo. 2. c. 16 (I)	29 April 1758
An Act for the recovery of small debts in a summary way in the city of Dublin and the liberties thereof. (Repealed by Civil Bill Courts (Ireland) Act 1851 (14 & 15 Vict. c. 57))
Lappers, Kelp, and Weavers Act 1757	31 Geo. 2. c. 17 (I)	29 April 1758
An Act to prevent frauds in lappers and others; and to prevent abuses in the manufacture of kelp; and to prevent unlawful combinations in weavers and others.
Castlecomer to Limerick Road Act 1757	31 Geo. 2. c. 18 (I)	29 April 1758
An Act for making and repairing the road from the town of Castlecomer (Note: Castlecomer, County Kilkenny.) in the county of Kilkenny through the towns of Ballyragget, (Note: Ballyragget, County Kilkenny.) Freshford, (Note: Freshford, County Kilkenny.) and Hurlingford (Note: Urlingford, County Kilkenny.) in the said county to the town of Dundrum (Note: Dundrum, County Tipperary.) in the county of Tipperary, and from thence through Newcastle to the city of Limerick.
Parliament Street Act 1757	31 Geo. 2. c. 19 (I)	29 April 1758
An Act for making a wide and convenient way, street, and passage, from Essex-Bridge to the Castle of Dublin, and for other purposes therein mentioned.
Baal's Bridge Act 1757	31 Geo. 2. c. 20 (I)	29 April 1758
An Act for the widening and repairing, or rebuilding a bridge called Baal's-bridge in the city and garrison of Limerick; and for enabling and obliging the persons, intitled to the houses and ground on the said bridge, to dispose of their interests in the same on reasonable terms for the purposes aforesaid.

=== Private acts ===
Short title, or popular name	Citation	Royal assent
Long title
Bayly's Estate Act 1757	31 Geo. 2. c. 1 Pr. (I)	29 April 1758
An Act to supply an omission in a settlement made on the intermarriage of John Bayly of Desborough in the county of Tipperary esquire, and to confirm the remainders limited by the said settlement to the sons of the said John Bayly, by an after taken wife.
St George and Parsons Estates Act 1757	31 Geo. 2. c. 2 Pr. (I)	29 April 1758
An Act to enable Pigot Parsons St George, esquire, William Parsons, esquire, William Parsons and Laurence Parsons, minors, under the age of 21 years, sons of the said William Parsons, to sell one undivided 3rd part of the several lands in the county of Galway, for the payment of charges and encumbrances affecting the same, and other purposes therein mentioned, and to enable Sir Ralph Gore St George, baronet, to sell and dispose of the manor, deer park, towns and lands of Manor Hamilton in the co. Leitrim, part of his settled estate, and with the money arising from the sale of the said lands, to purchase the undivided 3rd part of the said lands in the co. Galway, and settle the same to the same uses that the said manor, town and lands of Manor Hamilton are settled.
Parsons Estate Act 1757^{(Republic of Ireland)}	31 Geo. 2. c. 3 Pr. (I)	29 April 1758
An Act for vesting the estate of Dame Mary Parsons, daughter and heiress of John Cleare, late of Kilbury in the Co. Tipperary, esquire, deceased, comprehended in certain articles previous to the marriage of the said Dame Mary with Sir William Parsons, baronet, in certain trustees, for sale of a sufficient part thereof, to discharge the debts of the said John Cleare, and also the debts not exceeding £6,000 of the said Sir William Parsons, and for settling such part of the estate of the said Dame Mary as shall remain unsold, and the whole of the estate of the said Sir William Parsons comprehended in articles so executed, previous to the intermarriage of the said Sir William Parsons and Dame Mary, to and for the uses and purposes mentioned in or intended by the said articles, touching the said estates respectively, and also for settling certain lands which the said Sir William Parsons is seized in fee of, to the same uses and for the same trusts, intents and purposes, expressed in the said articles touching and concerning the estate of the said Dame Mary Parsons, except only so far as the said articles relate to the debts of the said John Cleare.
Johnson's Estate Act 1757	31 Geo. 2. c. 4 Pr. (I)	29 April 1758
An Act to enable and empower certain trustees to demise or lease certain houses and ground in the city and suburbs of the city of Dublin in the kingdom of Ireland, the estate of John Allen Johnson, a minor, under the age of 21 years, for any number of years, or for lives, with or without covenants of renewal forever, in possession or reversion.
Hill and Hutchinson Estates Act 1757	31 Geo. 2. c. 5 Pr. (I)	29 April 1758
An Act to enable the parties in a suit now depending in his majesty's court of chancery in Ireland, wherein the Right Honourable Arthur Hill, esquire, and Ann Hill, otherwise Stafford his wife, are plaintiffs, and the Reverend Samuel Hutchinson, dean of Dromore, and several others, are defendants, to raise the sum of £5,500 and interest, and to pay the same to the plaintiffs, pursuant to an agreement, in order finally to end the said suit amicably, as also to raise the money expended by the defendants in defending the said suit, and to defray the expenses that shall attend the passing of this act, and to enable Henry Hutchinson O'Hara, esquire, and also the Reverend Hutchinson Hamilton, clerk, and Charles Hamilton, esquire, to make leases of certain lands in this bill particularly mentioned, and to preserve the contingent remainders limited by the will of the Right Reverend Francis Hutchinson, late lord bishop of Down and Connor, from being defeated and destroyed.
Shaw's Estate Act 1757	31 Geo. 2. c. 6 Pr. (I)	29 April 1758
An Act for vesting the estate of Thomas Shaw of the town of Galway, esquire, in trustees, to be sold for the payment of encumbrances affecting the same.

=== Sources ===
- "Acts of Parliament by Session: 1757". Irish Legislation Database. Queen's University Belfast.

== 33 Geo. 2 (1759) ==
The 17th session of the parliament of George II, which met from 16 October 1759 to 17 May 1760.

This session was also traditionally cited as 33 G. 2.

=== Public acts ===
Short title, or popular name	Citation	Royal assent
Long title
Duties on Beer, etc. Act 1759 (repealed)	33 Geo. 2. c. 1 (I)	19 December 1759
An Act for granting and continuing to his Majesty an additional duty on beer, ale, strong waters, wine, tobacco, hides, and other goods and merchandizes therein mentioned; and for prohibiting the importation of all gold and silver lace, except of the manufacture of Great Britain. (Repealed by Statute Law Revision (Ireland) Act 1879 (42 & 43 Vict. c. 24))
Additional Duties and Funds Act 1759 (repealed)	33 Geo. 2. c. 2 (I)	19 December 1759
An Act for granting to his Majesty a further additional duty on wine, silk, hops, china, earthen, japanned, and lacquered ware, and vinegar, to be applied to pay an interest of four pounds per centum per annum, for such sums of money not exceeding in the whole the sum of one hundred and fifty thousand pounds, as shall be advanced and paid into his Majesty's treasury in manner therein mentioned, and towards the discharge of the said principal sums. (Repealed by Statute Law Revision (Ireland) Act 1879 (42 & 43 Vict. c. 24))
Popery Act 1759 (repealed)	33 Geo. 2. c. 3 (I)	19 December 1759
An Act for allowing further time to persons in offices or employments to qualify themselves pursuant to an act, intituled, "An Act to prevent the further growth of popery." (Note: Popery Act 1703 (2 Anne c. 6 (I))) (Repealed by Statute Law Revision (Ireland) Act 1879 (42 & 43 Vict. c. 24))
Clements, Malone and Gore's Bank Creditors Act 1759	33 Geo. 2. c. 4 (I)	17 May 1760
An Act for the speedy and effectual payment of the creditors of the bank kept by the right honourable Anthony Malone (Note: Anthony Malone.) esquire, the right honourable Nathaniel Clements (Note: Nathaniel Clements.) esquire, and John Gore (Note: John Gore, 1st Baron Annaly.) esquire.
Flax and Hempen Manufactures Act 1759	33 Geo. 2. c. 5 (I)	17 May 1760
An Act for altering and amending the laws in relation to the flaxen and hempen manufactures, and the other manufactures therein mentioned.
Hawkers and Pedlars (Ireland) Act 1759 (repealed)	33 Geo. 2. c. 6 (I)	17 May 1760
An Act for licensing Hawkers and Pedlars; and for encouragement of English Protestant Schools. (Repealed by Statute Law Revision (Ireland) Act 1879 (42 & 43 Vict. c. 24))
Counties of Cities Public Money Act 1759 (repealed)	33 Geo. 2. c. 7 (I)	17 May 1760
An Act for the more equal assessing and better collecting of Publick Money in Counties of Cities and Counties of Towns. (Repealed by Statute Law Revision (Ireland) Act 1879 (42 & 43 Vict. c. 24))
Highways Act 1759	33 Geo. 2. c. 8 (I)	17 May 1760
An Act to alter and amend the laws for the repair of highways.
Spirits Adulteration Act 1759 (repealed)	33 Geo. 2. c. 9 (I)	17 May 1760
An Act to prevent the mixing or adulterating of Strong Waters and other Spiritous Liquors. (Repealed by Statute Law Revision (Ireland) Act 1879 (42 & 43 Vict. c. 24))
Revenue Collection and Frauds Act 1759 (repealed)	33 Geo. 2. c. 10 (I)	17 May 1760
An Act for better regulating the collection of his Majesty's revenue, and for preventing of frauds therein; and for repealing an act made the last sessions of Parliament, intituled, "An act for continuing and amending several laws heretofore made, relating to his Majesty's revenue, and for the more effectual preventing of frauds in his Majesty's customs and excise" (Note: Revenue and Frauds Act 1757 (31 Geo. 2. c. 6 (I))) and the several acts and statutes which are mentioned in the said act, and continued thereby. (Repealed by Statute Law Revision (Ireland) Act 1879 (42 & 43 Vict. c. 24))
Parish Clerks and Churches Act 1759	33 Geo. 2. c. 11 (I)	17 May 1760
An Act for reviving and amending an act passed in the twenty third year of his present Majesty's reign, intituled, "An Act for amending, continuing, and making more effectual the several acts now in force in this kingdom for the more easy recovery of tythes, and other ecclesiastical dues of small value; and also for the more easy providing a maintenance for parish clerks;" (Note: Recovery of Tithes and Parish Clerks Act 1749 (23 Geo. 2. c. 12 (I))) so far only as the same relates to the more easy providing a maintenance for parish-clerks, and to encourage the building of new churches.
Dublin Corn and Flour Supply (Amendment) Act 1759 (repealed)	33 Geo. 2. c. 12 (I)	17 May 1760
An Act for amending an Act, intituled, "An Act for the better supplying the City of Dublin with Corn and Flour." (Note: Dublin Corn and Flour Supply Act 1757 (31 Geo. 2. c. 3 (I))) (Repealed by Statute Law Revision (Ireland) Act 1879 (42 & 43 Vict. c. 24))
County Treasurers Act 1759	33 Geo. 2. c. 13 (I)	17 May 1760
An Act for ascertaining the manner of appointing treasurers of counties, and for the more effectual recovery of publick money.
Bankers' Act 1759	33 Geo. 2. c. 14 (I)	17 May 1760
An Act for repealing an Act passed in this Kingdom in the eighth Year of the Reign of King George the first, intituled, "An Act for the better securing the Payment of Bankers' Notes" (Note: Bank Notes Act 1721 (8 Geo. 1. c. 14 (I))) and for providing a more effectual Remedy for the Security and Payment of Debts due by Bankers. (Repealed for the Republic of Ireland by Statute Law Revision (Pre-Union Irish Statutes) Act 1962 (No. 29))
Parliament Street and Baal's Bridge Amendment Act 1759	33 Geo. 2. c. 15 (I)	17 May 1760
An Act for amending an act passed in the thirty first year of his present Majesty's reign, intituled, "An Act for making a wide and convenient way, street, and passage from Essex-bridge to the castle of Dublin, and for other purposes therein mentioned;" (Note: Parliament Street Act 1757 (31 Geo. 2. c. 19 (I))) as also for amending another act passed in the same year, (Note: Baal's Bridge Act 1757 (31 Geo. 2. c. 20 (I))) for widening and repairing, or rebuilding Baal's-bridge in the city of Limerick.
Dublin Improvement Act 1759 (repealed)	33 Geo. 2. c. 16 (I)	17 May 1760
An Act for the better regulating the Corporation of the City of Dublin and for extending the Power of the Magistrates thereof, and for other Purposes relative to the said City. (Repealed for the Republic of Ireland by Statute Law Revision (Pre-Union Irish Statutes) Act 1962 (No. 29))
Insolvent Debtors Relief Act 1759 (repealed)	33 Geo. 2. c. 17 (I)	17 May 1760
An Act for the Relief of Insolvent Debtors. (Repealed by Statute Law Revision (Ireland) Act 1879 (42 & 43 Vict. c. 24))
Street Lighting Act 1759	33 Geo. 2. c. 18 (I)	17 May 1760
An Act for the more effectual enlightening of the city of Dublin and the liberties thereof; and for the erecting of publick lights in the other cities, towns-corporate, and market-towns in this kingdom.

=== Private acts ===
Short title, or popular name	Citation	Royal assent
Long title
Earl of Ranelagh Schools Act 1759^{(Republic of Ireland)}	33 Geo. 2. c. 1 Pr. (I)	17 May 1760
An Act for vesting the several estates granted by Richard, earl of Ranelagh, for the erecting and supporting two charity schools in the town of Athlone and two charity schools in the town of Roscommon, in the Incorporated Society in Dublin for Promoting English Protestant Schools in Ireland, and for other purposes mentioned therein.
Hamilton's Estate Act 1759	33 Geo. 2. c. 2 Pr. (I)	17 May 1760
An Act for vesting in trustees the estates and advowson of Sir Francis Hamilton, late of Castle Hamilton, baronet, deceased, for payment of debts affecting the same, and to make partition of the residue thereof between the co-heirs of Arthur Cecil Hamilton, esquire, deceased, and for other purposes therein mentioned.
Moore's Estate Act 1759	33 Geo. 2. c. 3 Pr. (I)	17 May 1760
An Act for vesting part of the estate of Garrett Moore, esquire, in trustees, to be sold for payment of encumbrances affecting the same, prior to his marriage.
Ruxton's Estate Act 1759	33 Geo. 2. c. 4 Pr. (I)	17 May 1760
An Act for vesting in trustees certain lands in the county of Louth, the settled estate of John Ruxton of Atherdee in the said county, esquire, to be sold for the payment of debts and his brothers and sister's portions, and for settling other towns, lands and tenements in the said county, the unsettled estate of the said John Ruxton, in lieu of the said lands to be sold.

=== Sources ===
- "Acts of Parliament by Session: 1759". Irish Legislation Database. Queen's University Belfast.

== See also ==
- List of acts of the Parliament of Ireland
- List of acts of the Oireachtas
- List of legislation in the United Kingdom
