= List of acts of the Parliament of Ireland, 1691–1700 =

This is a list of acts of the Parliament of Ireland for the years from 1691 to 1700.

The number shown by each act's title is its chapter number. Acts are cited using this number, preceded by the years of the reign during which the relevant parliamentary session was held; thus the act concerning assay passed in 1783 is cited as "23 & 24 Geo. 3 c. 23", meaning the 23rd act passed during the session that started in the 23rd year of the reign of George III and which finished in the 24th year of that reign. Note that the modern convention is to use Arabic numerals in citations (thus "40 Geo. 3" rather than "40 Geo. III"). Acts of the reign of Elizabeth I are formally cited without a regnal numeral in the Republic of Ireland.

Acts passed by the Parliament of Ireland did not have a short title; however, some of these acts have subsequently been given a short title by acts of the Parliament of the United Kingdom, acts of the Parliament of Northern Ireland, or acts of the Oireachtas. This means that some acts have different short titles in the Republic of Ireland and Northern Ireland respectively. Official short titles are indicated by the flags of the respective jurisdictions.

A number of the acts included in this list are still in force in Northern Ireland or the Republic of Ireland. Because these two jurisdictions are entirely separate, the version of an act in force in one may differ from the version in force in the other; similarly, an act may have been repealed in one but not in the other.

A number of acts passed by the Parliament of England also extended to Ireland during this period.

== 4 Will. & Mar. (1692) ==
The parliament of William and Mary, which met from 5 October 1692 until 3 November 1693.

This session was also traditionally cited as 4 W. & M.

Short title, or popular name	Citation	Royal assent
Long title
Crown Recognition Act (Ireland) 1692^{(United Kingdom)}	4 Will. & Mar. c. 1 (I)	3 November 1692
An Act of Recognition, of their Majesties undoubted Right to the Crown of Ireland. (Repealed for the Republic of Ireland by Statute Law Revision (Pre-Union Irish Statutes) Act 1962 (No. 29))
Protestant Strangers Act 1692 (repealed)	4 Will. & Mar. c. 2 (I)	3 November 1692
An Act for encouragement of Protestant strangers to settle in this kingdom of Ireland. (Repealed by Statute Law Revision (Ireland) Act 1878 (41 & 42 Vict. c. 57))
Additional Excise Act 1692 (repealed)	4 Will. & Mar. c. 3 (I)	3 November 1692
An Act for an Additional Duty of Excuse upon Beer, Ale, and other Liquors. (Repealed by Statute Law Revision (Ireland) Act 1878 (41 & 42 Vict. c. 57))
Commissioners for Taking Affidavits Act 1692 (repealed)	4 Will. & Mar. c. 4 (I)	3 November 1692
An Act for taking Affidavits in the Country, to be made use of in the Courts of King's Bench, Common Pleas and Exchequer. (Repealed for the Republic of Ireland by Statute Law Revision (Pre-Union Irish Statutes) Act 1962 (No. 29) and for Northern Ireland by the Statute Law Revision Act 1950 (14 Geo. 6. c. 6))

=== Sources ===
- "The fourth Year of William and Mary". Statutes Passed in the Parliaments Held in Ireland. Vol. II: From the Seventeenth and Eighteenth Years of Charles the Second, A.D. 1665, to the Eleventh Year of Anne, A.D. 1712, inclusive. Dublin: George Grierson. 1794. pp. 236–240 – via Google Books.
- "Acts of Parliament by Session: 1692". Irish Legislation Database. Queen's University Belfast.

== 7 Will. 3 (1695) ==
This session was also traditionally cited as 7 W. 3.

1st session of the 2nd parliament of William III, which met from 27 August 1695 until 14 December 1695.

=== Public acts ===
Short title, or popular name	Citation	Royal assent
Long title
Additional Excise Act 1695 (repealed)	7 Will. 3. c. 1 (I)	7 September 1695
An Act for an Additional Duty of Excise upon Beer, Ale, and other Liquors. (Repealed by Statute Law Revision (Ireland) Act 1878 (41 & 42 Vict. c. 57))
Ecclesiastical Jurisdiction Act 1695 (repealed)	7 Will. 3. c. 2 (I)	7 September 1695
An Act for taking away the Writ de heretico comburendo. (Repealed by Statute Law Revision (Ireland) Act 1878 (41 & 42 Vict. c. 57), for the Republic of Ireland by Statute Law Revision (Pre-Union Irish Statutes) Act 1962 (No. 29), and for Northern Ireland by the Statute Law Revision Act 1950 (14 Geo. 6. c. 6))
Settlement of Ireland Act 1695^{(United Kingdom)} (repealed)	7 Will. 3. c. 3 (I)	4 September 1695
An Act declaring all Attainders and all other Acts made in the late pretended Parliament, to be void. (Repealed for the Republic of Ireland by Statute Law Revision (Pre-Union Irish Statutes) Act 1962 (No. 29) and for Northern Ireland by Statute Law (Repeals) Act 1973 (c. 39))
Education Act 1695 (repealed)	7 Will. 3. c. 4 (I)	7 September 1695
An Act to Restrain foreign Education. (Repealed by Statute Law Revision (Ireland) Act 1878 (41 & 42 Vict. c. 57))
Papists Act 1695	7 Will. 3. c. 5 (I)	7 September 1695
An Act for the better securing the government, by disarming papists.
Statute of Distribution 1695^{(Republic of Ireland)}	7 Will. 3. c. 6 (I)	7 September 1695
An Act for the better settlings Intestates Estates.
Suits and Delays Act 1695 (repealed)	7 Will. 3. c. 7 (I)	22 October 1695
An Act for reviving two Statutes lately expired, making them perpetual; and for avoiding unnecessary Sutes and Delays. (Repealed by Statute Law Revision (Ireland) Act 1879 (42 & 43 Vict. c. 24))
Life Estates Act 1695^{(Republic of Ireland)}	7 Will. 3. c. 8 (I)	22 October 1695
An Act for redress of Inconveniences for want of proof of the deceases of persons beyond the Seas, or absenting themselves, upon whose Lives Estates do depend.
Profane Oaths Act 1695^{(Republic of Ireland)}	7 Will. 3. c. 9 (I)	22 October 1695
An Act for the more effectual suppressing of Prophane Cursing and Swearing.
Damage Clear Act 1695 (repealed)	7 Will. 3. c. 10 (I)	22 October 1695
An Act to take away Damage clear. (Repealed by Statute Law Revision (Ireland) Act 1878 (41 & 42 Vict. c. 57))
Benefit of Clergy (Stabbing) Act 1695 (repealed)	7 Will. 3. c. 11 (I)	22 October 1695
An Act to take away the Benefit of Clergy from him that doth stab another, not having a Weapon drawn. (Repealed by Offences Against the Person (Ireland) Act 1829 (10 Geo. 4. c. 34))
Statute of Frauds 1695^{(Republic of Ireland)} or the Statute of Frauds (Ireland) 1695^{(United Kingdom)}	7 Will. 3. c. 12 (I)	22 October 1695
An Act for the prevention of Frauds and Perjuries.
Sheriffs Act 1695^{(Republic of Ireland)} or the Sheriffs Act (Ireland) 1695^{(United Kingdom)} (repealed)	7 Will. 3. c. 13 (I)	22 October 1695
An Act for the more easie discharging of Sheriffs upon their Accounts, and from being Justices of the Peace. (Repealed for the Republic of Ireland by Statute Law Revision (Pre-Union Irish Statutes) Act 1962 (No. 29) and for Northern Ireland by Judicature (Northern Ireland) Act 1978 (c. 23))
Holy Days Act 1695 (repealed)	7 Will. 3. c. 14 (I)	22 October 1695
An Act declaring which days in the year shall be observed as holy-days. (Repealed by Statute Law Revision (Ireland) Act 1878 (41 & 42 Vict. c. 57))
Poll Tax Act 1695 (repealed)	7 Will. 3. c. 15 (I)	7 December 1695
An Act for granting a Supply to his Majesty, by raising Money by a Poll, and otherwise. (Repealed by Statute Law Revision (Ireland) Act 1878 (41 & 42 Vict. c. 57))
Additional Customs Act 1695 (repealed)	7 Will. 3. c. 16 (I)	7 December 1695
An Act for granting unto His Majesty an Aid or Additional Custom on the several Goods and Merchandizes therein mentioned. (Repealed by Statute Law Revision (Ireland) Act 1878 (41 & 42 Vict. c. 57))
Sunday Observance Act 1695^{(Republic of Ireland)} or the Sunday Observance Act (Ireland) 1695^{(United Kingdom)}	7 Will. 3. c. 17 (I)	7 December 1695
An Act for the better Observation of the Lord's-Day, commonly called Sunday.
Bail in Civil Actions Act 1695 (repealed)	7 Will. 3. c. 18 (I)	7 December 1695
An Act for taking special Bails in the Country, upon Actions and Sutes depending in the Courts of King's Bench, Common Pleas and Exchequer at Dublin. (Repealed for Ireland by Criminal Statutes Repeal Act 1861 (24 & 25 Vict. c. 95)), for the Republic of Ireland by Statute Law Revision (Pre-Union Irish Statutes) Act 1962 (No. 29), and for Northern Ireland by the Statute Law Revision Act 1950 (14 Geo. 6. c. 6))
Tipperary Palatine Court Act 1695 (repealed)	7 Will. 3. c. 19 (I)	7 December 1695
An Act for Granting Tales on Tryals, to be hade in the Court of the County Palatine of Tipperary, before the Seneshal. (Repealed by Statute Law Revision (Ireland) Act 1878 (41 & 42 Vict. c. 57))
Tipperary Palatine Fines Act 1695 (repealed)	7 Will. 3. c. 20 (I)	7 December 1695
An Act concerning Fines in the County Palatine of Tipperary. (Repealed by Statute Law Revision (Ireland) Act 1878 (41 & 42 Vict. c. 57))
Tories, Robbers, and Rapparees Act 1695 (repealed)	7 Will. 3. c. 21 (I)	1 December 1695
An Act for the better suppressing Tories, Robbers, and Rapparees; and for preventing Robberies, Burglaries, and other heinous Crimes. (Repealed by Statute Law Revision (Ireland) Act 1878 (41 & 42 Vict. c. 57))
Distress for Rent Act 1695^{(Republic of Ireland)}	7 Will. 3. c. 22 (I)	7 December 1695
An Act for the more speedy and effectual Proceeding upon Distresses and Avowries for Rent.
Additional Excise Continuance Act 1695 (repealed)	7 Will. 3. c. 23 (I)	14 December 1695
An Act for continuing the Statute for an Additional Excise upon Beer, Ale, and other Liquors. (Repealed by Statute Law Revision (Ireland) Act 1878 (41 & 42 Vict. c. 57))
Weights and Measures Act 1695 (repealed)	7 Will. 3. c. 24 (I)	14 December 1695
An Act for the better regulating of Measures in and throughout this Kingdom. (Repealed by Statute Law Revision (Ireland) Act 1879 (42 & 43 Vict. c. 24))
Vexatious Arrests and Delays in Suits Act 1695 (repealed)	7 Will. 3. c. 25 (I)	14 December 1695
An Act for the prevention of Vexations and Oppressions by Arrests; and of Delays in Sutes of Law. (Repealed by Statute Law Revision (Ireland) Act 1878 (41 & 42 Vict. c. 57))

=== Private acts ===
Short title, or popular name	Citation	Royal assent
Long title
Duke of Ormonde's Estate Act 1695	7 Will. 3. c. 1 Pr. (I)	7 December 1695
An Act for vesting certain manors, lands and tenements belonging to James, duke of Ormonde, in Ireland, in trustees to be sold, and enabling the said duke to make leases for raising of money to discharge the debts and encumbrances of his grandfather, the late duke of Ormonde, charged on his estate in Ireland, and likewise for raising portions for the younger daughters, which the said duke may happen to have, and securing the jointure of the present duchess.
Browne's Creditors Act 1695	7 Will. 3. c. 2 Pr. (I)	7 December 1695
An Act for securing the debts owing to the Protestant creditors of Colonel John Browne.
Limerick, Slane, and Athlone Act 1695	7 Will. 3. c. 3 Pr. (I)	7 December 1695
An Act for confirming the outlawries and attainders of William Dongan, late earl of Limerick, and Christopher, late lord baron of Slane, and for the confirming of several grants and letters patents made and granted to Godart, earl of Athlone.
Stafford's Estate Act 1695	7 Will. 3. c. 4 Pr. (I)	7 December 1695
An Act for settling divers lands and hereditaments in the county of Antrim, in the kingdom of Ireland, formerly the inheritance of Sir Edmond Stafford, knight, deceased, and by him conveyed to his nephew, Francis Echlin and the heirs males of his body, taking upon them the name of Stafford, upon such trustees, and with and under such provisoes and limitations as are expressed or contained in the said act.
Waller's Estate Act 1695	7 Will. 3. c. 5 Pr. (I)	14 December 1695
An Act for the relief of James Waller, esquire, and the settlement of the estate of Richard Waller of Castletown, esquire.

=== Sources ===
- "The seventh Year of William III". Statutes Passed in the Parliaments Held in Ireland. Vol. II: From the Seventeenth and Eighteenth Years of Charles the Second, A.D. 1665, to the Eleventh Year of Anne, A.D. 1712, inclusive. Dublin: George Grierson. 1794. pp. 241–287 – via Google Books.
- "Acts of Parliament by Session: 1695". Irish Legislation Database. Queen's University Belfast.
- "Pre-Union Irish Statutes: 1695 Acts". Irish Statute Book. Attorney General of Ireland.

== 9 Will. 3 (1697) ==
2nd session of the 2nd parliament of William III, which met from 27 July 1697 until 3 December 1697.

This session was also traditionally cited as 9 W. 3.

=== Public acts ===
Short title, or popular name	Citation	Royal assent
Long title
Banishment Act 1697 or the Bishops' Banishment Act 1697 (repealed)	9 Will. 3. c. 1 (I)	25 September 1697
An Act for banishing all Papists exercising any Ecclesiastical Jurisdiction, and all Regulars of the Popish Clergy out of this Kingdom. (Repealed by Statute Law Revision (Ireland) Act 1878 (41 & 42 Vict. c. 57))
Treaty of Limerick Confirmation Act 1697	9 Will. 3. c. 2 (I)	25 September 1697
An Act for the Confirmation of Articles made at the Surrender of the City of Limerick. (Repealed for the Republic of Ireland by Statute Law Revision (Pre-Union Irish Statutes) Act 1962 (No. 29))
Marriage Act 1697	9 Will. 3. c. 3 (I)	25 September 1697
An Act to prevent Protestants inter-marrying with Papists.
Import Duties Act 1697 (repealed)	9 Will. 3. c. 4 (I)	19 November 1697
An Act for Granting an Additional Duty on Tobacco and for continuing upon his Majesty an Aid or Additional Custom on several Goods and Merchandizes; and also for continuing the Additional Duty on Beer and Ale, and other Liquors, till the Twenty fifth day of December, One Thousand Seven Hundred and Two. (Repealed by Statute Law Revision (Ireland) Act 1878 (41 & 42 Vict. c. 57))
Confirmation of Several Outlawries Act 1697	9 Will. 3. c. 5 (I)	19 November 1697
An Act to hinder the Reversal of several Outlawries and Attainders, and to prevent the Return of Subjects of this Kingdom who have gone into the Dominions of the French King in Europe.
Crown Rents Collectors Receipts Act 1697	9 Will. 3. c. 6 (I)	19 November 1697
An Act for making the Collectors Receipts for Quit-Rent, Crown-Rent, and other Rents due to the Crown, full and Legal Discharges for the same, and for limitting their Fees thereon.
Benefit of Clergy Act 1697 (repealed)	9 Will. 3. c. 7 (I)	19 November 1697
An Act for taking away the Benefit of Clergy in some Case. (Repealed by Criminal Statutes (Ireland) Repeal Act 1828 (9 Geo. 4. c. 53))
Poll Tax Act 1697 (repealed)	9 Will. 3. c. 8 (I)	3 December 1697
An Act for granting a supply to his Majesty, by raising money by a poll. (Repealed by Statute Law Revision (Ireland) Act 1878 (41 & 42 Vict. c. 57))
Tories and Rapparees Suppression Amendment Act 1697 (repealed)	9 Will. 3. c. 9 (I)	3 December 1697
An Act to Supply the Defects, and for better Execution of an Act passed this present Session of Parliament, entituled, "An act for the better suppressing Tories and Rapparees; and for preventing Robberies, Burglaries, and other heinous Crimes." (Note: Tories, Robbers, and Rapparees Act 1695 (7 Will. 3. c. 21 (I))) (Repealed by Statute Law Revision (Ireland) Act 1878 (41 & 42 Vict. c. 57))
Frivolous Suits Act 1697 (repealed)	9 Will. 3. c. 10 (I)	3 December 1697
An Act for the preventing frivilous and vexatious Law-Sutes, and giving Remedy to the Parties grieved, to recover Costs at Law in certain cases where heretofore no Costs were given. (Repealed for the Republic of Ireland by Statute Law Revision (Pre-Union Irish Statutes) Act 1962 (No. 29) and for Northern Ireland by the Statute Law Revision Act 1950 (14 Geo. 6. c. 6))
Clandestine Mortgages Act 1697^{(Republic of Ireland)}	9 Will. 3. c. 11 (I)	3 December 1697
An Act to prevent Frauds by Clandestine Mortgages.
Partition Act 1697 (repealed)	9 Will. 3. c. 12 (I)	3 December 1697
An Act for the more easie obtaining of Partitions of Lands in Coparcenary, Joint-Tenancy, or Tenancy in common, and Bounding and Mearing of Lands. (Repealed by Statute Law Revision (Ireland) Act 1878 (41 & 42 Vict. c. 57))
Transferring Suits from Inferior Courts Act 1697 (repealed)	9 Will. 3. c. 13 (I)	3 December 1697
An Act for avoiding of vexatious Delays causes by removing Actions and Sutes out of Inferior Courts. (Repealed for the Republic of Ireland by Statute Law Revision (Pre-Union Irish Statutes) Act 1962 (No. 29) and for Northern Ireland by the Statute Law Revision Act 1950 (14 Geo. 6. c. 6))
Pewter and Brass Manufacture Act 1697 (repealed)	9 Will. 3. c. 14 (I)	3 December 1697
An Act for Redress of certain Abuses in making Pewter and Brass. (Repealed by Statute Law Revision (Ireland) Act 1878 (41 & 42 Vict. c. 57))
Small Debts Recovery Act 1697 (repealed)	9 Will. 3. c. 15 (I)	3 December 1697
An Act for the more easie and speedy securing and recovery of small Debts. (Repealed by Civil Bill Courts (Ireland) Act 1851 (14 & 15 Vict. c. 57))
St. Michan's Parish Act 1697^{(Republic of Ireland)}	9 Will. 3. c. 16 (I)	3 December 1697
An Act for dividing the Parish of St. Michan's, within the City and Suburbs of Dublin, into three distinct Parishes.
Dublin Street Lights Act 1697 (repealed)	9 Will. 3. c. 17 (I)	3 December 1697
An Act for erecting and continuing Lights in the City of Dublin, and the several Liberties adjoyning. (Repealed by Statute Law Revision (Ireland) Act 1878 (41 & 42 Vict. c. 57))
Bandon Relief Act 1697	9 Will. 3. c. 18 (I) (Note: Also listed as 9 Will. 3. c. 14 Pr. (I))	3 December 1697
An Act for raising £2,500 for the relief of the inhabitants of Bandon.

=== Private acts ===
Short title, or popular name	Citation	Royal assent
Long title
Lord Folliot's Estate Act 1697	9 Will. 3. c. 1 Pr. (I)	25 September 1697
An Act to enable Henry Lord Folliot to settle a jointure and makes leases for lives, or terms of years, and charge his estate with a sum not exceeding £5,000 for provision of younger children, etc.
Domvill's Estate Act 1697	9 Will. 3. c. 2 Pr. (I)	25 September 1697
An Act for vesting certain lands of Sir William Domvill, knight, for the raising £1,000 by mortgage for payment of debts.
Ormesby's Estate Act 1697	9 Will. 3. c. 3 Pr. (I)	25 September 1697
An Act to enable John Ormesby, esquire, to raise £3,000 to make good an agreement and decree in chancery between him and Gilbert Ormesby.
Parsons' Estate Act 1697	9 Will. 3. c. 4 Pr. (I)	25 September 1697
An Act for enabling Sir Laurence Parsons, baronet, and William Parsons, esquire, his son and heir apparent, to sell certain lands, tenements and tithes for payment of debts.
Jephson's Estate Act 1697	9 Will. 3. c. 5 Pr. (I)	25 September 1697
An Act to enable William Jephson, esquire, to sell part of his estate for payment of his debts contracted in the late troubles.
Delamer's Estate Act 1697	9 Will. 3. c. 6 Pr. (I)	25 September 1697
An Act to prevent the disinheriting of Richard Delamer, esquire.
Jones' Estate Act 1697	9 Will. 3. c. 7 Pr. (I)	25 September 1697
An Act to enable William Jones, esquire, to raise money on his estate for payment of debts and portions.
Ponsonby's Estate Act 1697	9 Will. 3. c. 8 Pr. (I)	25 September 1697
An Act to enable Colonel William Ponsonby to settle a jointure on his wife, and raise portions for younger children.
Stopford's Estate Act 1697	9 Will. 3. c. 9 Pr. (I)	25 September 1697
An Act for vesting certain lands, tenements and hereditaments of Robert Stopford, esquire, in the kingdom of Ireland, in trustees, to be sold for the payment of his fathers debts, his sisters portions and other encumbrances, and enabling the said Robert Stopford and those in remainder to make leases of the residue of the said estate.
Barton's Estate Act 1697	9 Will. 3. c. 10 Pr. (I)	25 September 1697
An Act for securing to William Barton and John Usher their several interests in some lands in the county of Louth.
Morris's Estate Act 1697	9 Will. 3. c. 11 Pr. (I)	25 September 1697
An Act to enable Samuel Morris, esquire, to charge or sell part of his estate for payment of his debts.
Eustace's Estate Act 1697	9 Will. 3. c. 12 Pr. (I)	3 December 1697
An Act for settling certain rectories, according to the will of Sir Maurice Eustace, late lord chancellor of Ireland.
Barry's Estate Act 1697	9 Will. 3. c. 13 Pr. (I)	3 December 1697
An Act to enable James Barry, esquire, to charge his estate with the payment of his debts and sisters’ portions.
Bandon Relief Act 1697	9 Will. 3. c. 14 Pr. (I) (Note: Also listed as 9 Will. 3. c. 18 (I))	3 December 1697
An Act for raising £2,500 for the relief of the inhabitants of Bandon.

=== Sources ===
- "The ninth Year of William III". Statutes Passed in the Parliaments Held in Ireland. Vol. II: From the Seventeenth and Eighteenth Years of Charles the Second, A.D. 1665, to the Eleventh Year of Anne, A.D. 1712, inclusive. Dublin: George Grierson. 1794. pp. 287–340 – via Google Books.
- "Acts of Parliament by Session: 1697". Irish Legislation Database. Queen's University Belfast.

== 10 Will. 3 (1698) ==
3rd session of the 2nd parliament of William III, which met from 27 September 1698 until 26 January 1699.

This session was also traditionally cited as 10 W. 3.

=== Public acts ===
Short title, or popular name	Citation	Royal assent
Long title
Poor Prisoners Relief Act 1698 (repealed)	10 Will. 3. c. 1 (I)	2 November 1698
An Act for the Relief and Release of poor distressed Prisoners for Debt and Damages. (Repealed by Statute Law Revision (Ireland) Act 1878 (41 & 42 Vict. c. 57))
Butter and Butter Casks Act 1698	10 Will. 3. c. 2 (I)	2 November 1698
An Act for reforming Abuses in making of Butter and preventing of false Packing of Butter.
Land Tax Act (Ireland) 1698 (repealed)	10 Will. 3. c. 3 (I)	26 January 1699
An Act for raising One Hundred and Twenty Thousand Pounds on all Lands, Tenements, and Hereditaments in this Kingdom. (Repealed by Statute Law Revision (Ireland) Act 1878 (41 & 42 Vict. c. 57))
Supply and Barracks Act 1698 (repealed)	10 Will. 3. c. 4 (I)	26 January 1699
An Act to compleat the Supply to his Majesty, and build and finish the Barracks in this Kingdom. (Repealed by Statute Law Revision (Ireland) Act 1878 (41 & 42 Vict. c. 57))
Woollen Manufactures Export Duty Act 1698 (repealed)	10 Will. 3. c. 5 (I)	26 January 1699
An Act for the laying an Additional Duty upon Woolen Manufactures Exported out of this Kingdom. (Repealed by Statute Law Revision (Ireland) Act 1878 (41 & 42 Vict. c. 57))
Glebe Act 1698^{(Republic of Ireland)}	10 Will. 3. c. 6 (I)	26 January 1699
An Act to encourage the Building of Houses, and making other Improvements on Church-Lands, and to prevent Dilapidations.
Confirming Estates under Acts of Settlement Act 1698	10 Will. 3. c. 7 (I)	26 January 1699
An Act for confirming Estates and Possessions held and enjoyed under the Acts of Settlement and Explanation. (Repealed for the Republic of Ireland by Statute Law Revision (Pre-Union Irish Statutes) Act 1962 (No. 29))
Deer Protection Act 1698^{(Republic of Ireland)}	10 Will. 3. c. 8 (I)	26 January 1699
An Act for the preservation of the Game, and the more easie Conviction of such as shall destroy the Game.
Four Courts Marshalsea Regulation Act 1698 (repealed)	10 Will. 3. c. 9 (I)	26 January 1699
An Act for regulating the Fees of the Marshal of the Four Courts, and for settling the Rates of Lodgings, and Redress of other Abuses in the said Marshalsey, and in the Marshalsey of the City of London. (Repealed by Prisons (Ireland) Act 1810 (50 Geo. 3. c. 103))
Traversing of Inquisitions Act 1698	10 Will. 3. c. 10 (I)	26 January 1699
An Act for traversing Inquisitions. (Repealed for the Republic of Ireland by Statute Law Revision (Pre-Union Irish Statutes) Act 1962 (No. 29))
Gaming Act 1707	10 Will. 3. c. 11 (I)	26 January 1699
An Act against deceitful, disorderly and excessive Gaming.
Timber Act 1698	10 Will. 3. c. 12 (I)	26 January 1699
An Act for Planting and preserving Timber, Trees and Woods.
Papists Act 1698 (repealed)	10 Will. 3. c. 13 (I)	26 January 1699
An Act to prevent Papists being Solicitors. (Repealed by Statute Law Revision (Ireland) Act 1878 (41 & 42 Vict. c. 57))
Arbitration Act 1698	10 Will. 3. c. 14 (I)	26 January 1699
An Act for determining Differences by Arbitration.
Duncannon Fort Act 1698	10 Will. 3. c. 15 (I)	26 January 1699
An Act for the better management and disposal of the Lands set apart for the Support of the Fort of Duncannon.
Act of Settlement Explanation Act 1698	10 Will. 3. c. 16 (I)	26 January 1699
An Act for explaining some Doubts that may arise on the Exposition of an Act passed this Session of Parliament, Intituled, "An Act for Confirming Estates and Possessions held and enjoying under the Acts of Settlement and Explanation;" (Note: Confirming Estates under Acts of Settlement Act 1698 (10 Will. 3. c. 7 (I))) and also for Amending some words in an Act passed the last Session of this present Parliament, Intituled, "An Act to hinder the Reversal of several Outlawries and Attainders; and to prevent the return of Subjects of this Kingdom, who have gone into the Dominions of the French King in Europe." (Note: Confirmation of Several Outlawries Act 1697 (9 Will. 3. c. 5 (I)))

=== Private acts ===
Short title, or popular name	Citation	Royal assent
Long title
Parsons Estate Act 1698	10 Will. 3. c. 1 Pr. (I)	26 January 1699
An Act for enabling Sir William Parsons, baronet, to charge his estate with £2,200.
Ponsonby's Estate Act 1698	10 Will. 3. c. 2 Pr. (I)	26 January 1699
An Act to supply the defects and for the better execution of an act entitled "An Act to enable Colonel William Ponsonby to settle a jointure on his wife and raise portions for his younger children." (Note: Ponsonby's Estate Act 1697 (9 Will. 3. c. 8 Pr. (I)))
Morgan's Estate Act 1698	10 Will. 3. c. 3 Pr. (I)	26 January 1699
An Act to enable Hugh Morgan, esquire, to raise £2,100 on his estate for provision of his younger children

=== Sources ===
- "The tenth Year of William III". Statutes Passed in the Parliaments Held in Ireland. Vol. II: From the Seventeenth and Eighteenth Years of Charles the Second, A.D. 1665, to the Eleventh Year of Anne, A.D. 1712, inclusive. Dublin: George Grierson. 1794. pp. 341–381 – via Google Books.
- "Acts of Parliament by Session: 1698". Irish Legislation Database. Queen's University Belfast.

== See also ==
- List of acts of the Parliament of Ireland
- List of acts of the Oireachtas
- List of legislation in the United Kingdom
