= Statute Law Revision (Ireland) Act 1878 =

Act of the Parliament of the United Kingdom

Statute Law Revision (Ireland) Act 1878 (Note: Section 2.)
- Act of Parliament
- Parliament of the United Kingdom
- Long title: An Act for the Revision of the Statute Law of Ireland.
- Citation: 41 & 42 Vict. c. 79
- Introduced by: James Lowther MP (Commons); Hugh Cairns, 1st Earl Cairns (Lords)
- Territorial extent: United Kingdom

Dates
- Royal assent: 13 August 1878
- Commencement: 13 August 1878 (Note: The Acts of Parliament (Commencement) Act 1793.)
Other legislation
Amends	§ Repealed enactments
Repeals/revokes	See § Repealed enactments
Amended by	Statute Law Revision Act 1894
Relates to	Repeal of Obsolete Statutes Act 1856; See Statute Law Revision Act

Status: Partially repealed

History of passage through Parliament

Records of Parliamentary debate relating to the statute from Hansard

Text of statute as originally enacted

The Statute Law Revision (Ireland) Act 1878 (41 & 42 Vict. c. 57) is an act of the Parliament of the United Kingdom that repealed for Ireland enactments of the Parliament of Ireland from 1310 to 1747 which had ceased to be in force or had become necessary. The act was intended, in particular, to facilitate the preparation of the revised edition of the Irish statutes, then in progress.

== Background ==
In the United Kingdom, acts of Parliament remain in force until expressly repealed. Blackstone's Commentaries on the Laws of England, published in the late 18th-century, raised questions about the system and structure of the common law and the poor drafting and disorder of the existing statute book.

From 1810 to 1825, The Statutes of the Realm was published, providing the first authoritative collection of acts. The first statute law revision act was not passed until 1856 with the Repeal of Obsolete Statutes Act 1856 (19 & 20 Vict. c. 64). This approach — focusing on removing obsolete laws from the statute book followed by consolidation — was proposed by Peter Locke King MP, who had been highly critical of previous commissions' approaches, expenditures, and lack of results.

Previous Acts
Year passed	Title	Citation	Effect
1861	Statute Law Revision Act 1861	24 & 25 Vict. c. 101	Repealed or amended over 800 enactments
1863	Statute Law Revision Act 1863	26 & 27 Vict. c. 125	Repealed or amended over 1,600 enactments for England and Wales
1867	Statute Law Revision Act 1867	30 & 31 Vict. c. 59	Repealed or amended over 1,380 enactments
1870	Statute Law Revision Act 1870	33 & 34 Vict. c. 69	Repealed or amended over 250 enactments
1871	Promissory Oaths Act 1871	34 & 35 Vict. c. 48	Repealed or amended almost 200 enactments
1871	Statute Law Revision Act 1871	34 & 35 Vict. c. 116	Repealed or amended over 1,060 enactments
1872	Statute Law Revision Act 1872	35 & 36 Vict. c. 63	Repealed or amended almost 490 enactments
1872	Statute Law (Ireland) Revision Act 1872	35 & 36 Vict. c. 98	Repealed or amended over 1,050 enactments
1872	Statute Law Revision Act 1872 (No. 2)	35 & 36 Vict. c. 97	Repealed or amended almost 260 enactments
1873	Statute Law Revision Act 1873	36 & 37 Vict. c. 91	Repealed or amended 1,225 enactments
1874	Statute Law Revision Act 1874	37 & 38 Vict. c. 35	Repealed or amended over 490 enactments
1874	Statute Law Revision Act 1874 (No. 2)	37 & 38 Vict. c. 96	Repealed or amended almost 470 enactments
1875	Statute Law Revision Act 1875	38 & 39 Vict. c. 66	Repealed or amended over 1,400 enactments
1876	Statute Law Revision (Substituted Enactments) Act 1876	39 & 40 Vict. c. 20	Updated references to repealed acts

== Passage ==
Leave to bring in the Statute Law Revision (Ireland) Bill was granted to the Attorney-General for Ireland, James Lowther MP had its first reading in the House of Commons on 2 May 1878. The bill had its second reading in the House of Commons on 12 April 1878 and (following a number of deferrals) on 6 June 1878 and was committed to a committee of the whole house, which met and reported on 31 July 1878, without amendments. The bill had its third reading in the House of Commons on 2 August 1878 and passed, without amendments.

The bill had its first reading in the House of Lords on 2 August 1878, introduced by the Lord Chancellor, Hugh Cairns, 1st Earl Cairns. The bill had its second reading in the House of Lords on 6 August 1878 and was committed to a committee of the whole house, which met and reported on 9 August 1878, without amendments. The bill had its third reading in the House of Lords on 9 August 1878 and passed, without amendments.

The bill was granted royal assent on 13 August 1878.

== Subsequent developments ==
The act was intended, in particular, to facilitate the preparation of a revised edition of the Irish statutes.

The act was retained for the Republic of Ireland by section 2(2)(a) of, and part 4 of schedule 1 to, the Statute Law Revision Act 2007, which came into force on 8 May 2007.

The schedule to this act was repealed by section 1 of, and the first schedule to, the Statute Law Revision Act 1894 (57 & 58 Vict. c. 54), which came into force on 25 August 1894.

== Repealed enactments ==
Section 1 of the act repealed 461 enactments, listed in the schedule to the act, across six categories: (Note: The Note of the bill, unlike the schedule, gives commentary on each act, noting any earlier repeals and the reason for the new repeal.)

- Expired
- Spent
- Repealed in general terms
- Virtually repealed
- Superseded
- Obsolete

Section 1 of the act included several safeguards to ensure that the repeal does not negatively affect existing rights or ongoing legal matters. Specifically, any legal rights, privileges, or remedies already obtained under the repealed laws, as well as any legal proceedings or principles established by them, remain unaffected. Section 1 of the act also ensured that repealed enactments that have been incorporated into other laws would continue to have legal effect in those contexts. Moreover, the repeal would not revive any former rights, offices, or jurisdictions that had already been abolished.

Citation	Short title	Title	Extent of repeal
3 Edw. 2. c. 2 (I)	N/A	An Act against the keeping of idle Men and Kearns in time of Peace.	The whole act.
3 Edw. 2. c. 3 (I)	N/A	An Act against giving of Protections.	The whole act.
3 Edw. 2. c. 4 (I)	N/A	An Act against fraudulent Conveyances.	The whole act.
3 Edw. 2. c. 5 (I)	N/A	An Act that Justices of Assize shall deliver Estreates into the Exchequer.	The whole act.
18 Hen. 6. c. 1 (I)	N/A	An Act against the Extortion of Purveyors and Harbengers.	The whole act.
18 Hen. 6. c. 2 (I)	N/A	An Act that such as put themselves into Comrick or that do take any to Comrick shall be Traytors, and that the Comrick shall be Treason.	The whole act.
18 Hen. 6. c. 4 (I)	N/A	An Act that no Protection (quia profecturus) shall be granted before that the Party make Oath that the Cause containeth Truth, &c.	The whole act.
25 Hen. 6. c. 1 (I)	N/A	An Act that the King's Officers may travel by Sea from one Place to another within the Land of Ireland.	The whole act.
25 Hen. 6. c. 2 (I)	N/A	An Act that the King's Subjects or Officers in Ireland may be absent by the Commandment of the King, or of the Governor, or of the Council, without seizure of their Lands, Rents, Benefices, or Offices, &c.	The whole act.
25 Hen. 6. c. 7 (I)	N/A	An Act that the Sons of Labourers and Travailers of the Ground, as Ploughmen and such other, shall use the same Labours and Travailes that their Fathers and Parentes have done.	The whole act.
25 Hen. 6. c. 8 (I)	N/A	An Act that no Lord of Parliament shall be amerced in Plees real or personal otherwise than another Person.	The whole act.
25 Hen. 6. c. 9 (I)	N/A	An Act against Absentees.	The whole act.
28 Hen. 6 (Dublin). c. 2 (I)	N/A	An Act the title of which begins with the words,—An Act that upon Accusations made,—and ends with the words,—Cause shall require.	The whole act.
28 Hen. 6 (Dublin). c. 4 (I)	N/A	An Act that the Chancellor, Justices or Barons, or their Ministers, shall make forth no Writts of Privilege, but only for the Ministers or Servants continually attendant upon them.	The whole act.
28 Hen. 6 (Drogheda). c. 1 (I)	N/A	An Act that no Remembrancer nor his Deputy shall cause any process to be made against any that hath Discharge of Record in the Exchequer.	The whole act.
28 Hen. 6 (Drogheda). c. 2 (I)	N/A	An Act the title of which begins with the words,—An Act that no Commission shall be made out of the Chancery,—and ends with the words,—Inquisition ended.	The whole act.
28 Hen. 6 (Drogheda). c. 3 (I)	N/A	An Act the title of which begins with the words,—An Act that none shall sell Wine,—and ends with the word,—Half-pint.	The whole act.
32 Hen. 6. c. 1 (I)	N/A	An Act that all Statutes made against Provisioners as well in England as in Ireland shall be had and kept in force.	The whole act.
32 Hen. 6. c. 2 (I)	N/A	An Act for Discharge of the Jurors upon Inquistions upon Sight of the Bodies before Coroners, being at two several Days sworn that they do not know the Felon.	The whole act.
32 Hen. 6. c. 3 (I)	N/A	An Act the title of which begins with the words,—An Act that the Matter of every Appeal,—and ends with the words,—as Law will.	The whole act.
33 Hen. 6. c. 1 (I)	N/A	An Act whereby Commissioners are prohibited to award Exigents.	The whole act.
33 Hen. 6. c. 2 (I)	N/A	An Act that the Recorders or Clerks of Dublin and Drogheda shall have but two Pence for their Copy.	The whole act.
33 Hen. 6. c. 4 (I)	N/A	An Act concerning Commissioners and Escheators.	The whole act.
36 Hen. 6. c. 2 (I)	N/A	An Act concerning the Inclosing of Towns and Villages.	The whole act.
38 Hen. 6. c. 1 (I)	N/A	An Act that none shall sue Actions in the Exchequer, unless the Plaintiff be Minister to the Exchequer or Servant to any Minister of Record of the Exchequer, upon pain of Ten Pounds.	The whole act.
2 Edw. 4. c. 1 (I)	N/A	An Act that certain Money shall be received of the Issues and Profits of the Courts for the repairing of the Hall of the Castle.	The whole act.
3 Edw. 4. c. 1 (I)	N/A	An Act whereby the Lords and Commons of the Parliament hath Privilege for certain Days before and after the said Parliament.	The whole act.
3 Edw. 4. c. 2 (I)	N/A	An Act what Fees Ministers in the King's Court shall take and what Fees shall be paid for Writs and other Records.	The whole act.
5 Edw. 4. c. 1 (I)	N/A	An Act that no Arrest shall be touching the Feoffee to Use as should be touching him to whose Use he standeth infeoffed.	The whole act.
5 Edw. 4. c. 3 (I)	N/A	An Act that all Irishmen dwelling in the Counties of Dublin, Myeth, Vriell, and Kildare shall go apparelled like Englishmen, and wear their Beards after the English manner, swear Allegiance, and take English Sirename.	The whole act.
5 Edw. 4. c. 4 (I)	N/A	An Act that every Englishman and Irishman that dwelleth with Englishmen and speaketh English, between sixty and sixteen in years, shall have an English Bow and Arrows.	The whole act.
5 Edw. 4. c. 5 (I)	N/A	An Act for having a Constable in every Town, and a pair of Butts for shooting, and that every Man between sixty and sixteen shall shoot every Holy-day in the same Butts.	The whole act.
7 Edw. 4. c. 1 (I)	N/A	An Act that no Governour for the Time being may pass into Islands.	The whole act.
7 & 8 Edw. 4. c. 3 (I)	N/A	An Act whereby Letters Patent of Pardon from the King to those that sue to Rome for certain Things is void.	The whole act.
7 & 8 Edw. 4. c. 4 (I)	N/A	An Act for the removing of the Exchequer and Common Pleas.	The whole act.
8 Edw. 4 (1469). c. 2 (I)	N/A	An Act against Ingrossers and Regrators of Corn.	The whole act.
12 Edw. 4. c. 1 (I)	N/A	An Act prohibiting Staple Wares to be carried into Scotland without paying Custome.	The whole act.
12 Edw. 4. c. 3 (I)	N/A	An Act that no grain be laden out of the Realm unless the same be at a certain Price.	The whole act.
18 Edw. 4. c. 2 (I)	N/A	An Act concerning the choosing of Knights and Burgesses of Parliament.	The whole act.
20 Edw. 4. c. 1 (I)	N/A	An Act to restrain the carrying of Hawks out of this Kingdom.	The whole act.
8 Hen. 7. c. 1 (I)	N/A	An Act for the cleansing of the Watercourse in St. Patrick's Street.	The whole act.
10 Hen. 7. c. 2 (I)	N/A	An Act the title of which begins with the words,—An Act that the Chancellor,—and ends with the words,—Will and Pleasure.	The whole act.
10 Hen. 7. c. 3 (I)	N/A	An Act admitting a Prescription which Traytors and Rebels claimed within this Land.	The whole act.
10 Hen. 7. c. 4 (I)	Poynings' Law (on certification of acts)	An Act that no Parliament be holden in this Land until the Acts be certified into England.	The whole act.
10 Hen. 7. c. 5 (I)	N/A	An Act against Provisors to Rome.	The whole act.
10 Hen. 7. c. 6 (I)	N/A	An Act that no Citizen receive Livery or Wages of any Lord or Gentleman.	The whole act.
10 Hen. 7. c. 7 (I)	N/A	An Act that none be admitted Alderman, Juror, or Freeman in no Town, but if he have been Prentice or Inhabitant in the same.	The whole act.
10 Hen. 7. c. 8 (I)	N/A	An Act for the Confirmation of the Statutes of Kilkenny.	The whole act.
10 Hen. 7. c. 9 (I)	N/A	An Act that the Subjects of this Realm shall have Bows and other Armour.	The whole act.
10 Hen. 7. c. 10 (I)	N/A	An Act that the Captains of the Marches do certifie the Names of such as they have in their Retinue.	The whole act.
10 Hen. 7. c. 11 (I)	N/A	An Act that no Person take any Money or Amends for the Death or Murder of his friend or Kinsman, other than the King's Laws will.	The whole act.
10 Hen. 7. c. 12 (I)	N/A	An Act that no Great Ordinances be in no Fortress but by the Licence of the Deputy.	The whole act.
10 Hen. 7. c. 13 (I)	N/A	An Act that no Person stir any Irishry to make War.	The whole act.
10 Hen. 7. c. 15 (I)	N/A	An Act touching the keeping of Records of the Earldoms of Marche, Connacht, Trym, and Ulster.	The whole act.
10 Hen. 7. c. 16 (I)	N/A	A Statute for the Lords of the Parliament to wear Robes.	The whole act.
10 Hen. 7. c. 18 (I)	N/A	An Act for Registration of a new Maner of Coyn and Livery upon Pains comprised in the Statute of Kilkenny.	The whole act.
10 Hen. 7. c. 19 (I)	N/A	An Act declaring a Rate what Souldiers shall pay for their Meat and Drink in Time of Hostility.	The whole act.
10 Hen. 7. c. 20 (I)	N/A	An Act abolishing these Words Cromabo and Butlerabo.	The whole act.
10 Hen. 7. c. 23 (I)	N/A	An Act repealing a Parliament holden at Drogheda before Robert Prestonte, Lord of Gormanstowne.	The whole act.
14 Hen. 7. c. 1 (I)	N/A	An Act for punishing of Customers, &c., for their Misdemeanors.	The whole act.
15 Hen. 7. c. 1 (I)	N/A	Twelve pence levied by the King out of every twenty shillings worth of Wares brought into Ireland, Wine and Oyl only excepted.	The whole act.
7 Hen. 8. c. 1 (I)	N/A	An Act for and against such as sue Letters under the Privy Seal out of England.	The whole act.
25 Hen. 8. c. 1 (I)	N/A	An Act for Lezers of Corn.	The whole act.
25 Hen. 8. c. 2 (I)	N/A	An Act for the Uniting and Appropriation of the Parsonage of Galtryme to the Priory of St. Peter's by Trymme.	The whole act.
28 Hen. 8. c. 2 (I)	N/A	An Act of Succession of the King and Queen Anne.	Except Sections Two and Nine.
28 Hen. 8. c. 3 (I)	N/A	The Act of Absentees.	The whole act.
28 Hen. 8. c. 4 (I)	N/A	The Repeal of Poyning's Act.	The whole act.
28 Hen. 8. c. 11 (I)	N/A	An Act restraining Tributes to be given to Irishmen.	The whole act.
28 Hen. 8. c. 12 (I)	N/A	An Act against Proctors to be any member of Parliament.	The whole act.
28 Hen. 8. c. 13 (I)	N/A	An Act against the authority of the Bishop of Rome.	The whole act.
28 Hen. 8. c. 15 (I)	N/A	An Act for the English Order, Habite, and Language.	The whole act.
28 Hen. 8. c. 16 (I)	N/A	An Act for the Suppression of Abbeys.	The whole act.
28 Hen. 8. c. 18 (I)	N/A	An Act for the Proofs of Testaments.	Except Section One, from "and to die," to "delivered in manner and forme as is aforesaid."
28 Hen. 8. c. 19 (I)	N/A	The Act of Faculties.	The whole act.
28 Hen. 8. c. 21 (I)	N/A	The Act of penal Statutes.	The whole act.
28 Hen. 8. c. 24 (I)	N/A	The Act for Lessers of Corn.	The whole act.
28 Hen. 8. c. 25 (I)	N/A	The Act of Leases.	The whole act.
28 Hen. 8. c. 26 (I)	N/A	An Act for the First Fruites of Abbeyes, Priories, and Colleges.	The whole act.
28 Hen. 8. c. 27 (I)	N/A	An Act of Subsidie.	The whole act.
33 Hen. 8. c. 13 (I)	N/A	An Act for Attournments.	The whole act.
33 Hen. 8. c. 14 (I)	N/A	An Act for erecting of Vicarages.	The whole act.
33 Hen. 8. c. 15 (I)	N/A	An Act for Vagabonds.	The whole act.
33 Hen. 8 Sess. 2. c. 1 (I)	N/A	An Act for the Adjournment of the Parliament and the Place to hold the same, and what Persons shall be chosen Knights and Burgesses.	The whole act.
33 Hen. 8 Sess. 2. c. 3 (I)	N/A	An Act touching Mispleading and Jeoyfailes.	Except Section Three.
33 Hen. 8 Sess. 2. c. 4 (I)	N/A	An Act for Lands given by the King.	The whole act.
33 Hen. 8 Sess. 2. c. 5 (I)	N/A	An Act for the Suppression of Kylmaynham and other Religious Houses.	Sections Five; Eight to Twenty-three; Twenty-five, Twenty-six.
34 Hen. 8. c. 2 (I) (Note: The text of the act incorrectly cites this as "33 Hen. 8 sess. 2. c. 2")	N/A	An Act that for Persons standing bound in any Court for their Appearance, and being in Service to be discharged by Writt.	The whole act.
3 & 4 Phil. & Mar. c. 2 (I)	N/A	An Act whereby the King and Queen's Majesties, and the Heires and Successours of the Queen, be intituled to the Countries of Leix, Slewmarge, Irry, Glinmaliry, and Offaily, and for making the same Countries Shire Grounds.	Sections Four and Six.
3 & 4 Phil. & Mar. c. 3 (I)	N/A	An Act to convert and turne divers and sundry Waste Grounds into Shire Grounds.	The whole act.
3 & 4 Phil. & Mar. c. 4 (I)	N/A	An Act declaring how Poning's Acts shall be exponed and taken.	The whole act.
3 & 4 Phil. & Mar. c. 5 (I)	N/A	An Act against Corsors and Idle Men.	The whole act.
3 & 4 Phil. & Mar. c. 7 (I)	N/A	An Act concerning making of Aqua vite.	The whole act.
3 & 4 Phil. & Mar. c. 8 (I)	N/A	An Act the title of which begins with the words,—An Act repealing,—and ends with the words,—to the Laity.	The whole act.
3 & 4 Phil. & Mar. c. 11 (I)	N/A	An Act whereby certeine Offences be made Treasons, and alsoe for the Government of the King and Queen's Majestie's Yeres.	Except Section Six to "otherwise," and Section Seven.
3 & 4 Phil. & Mar. c. 12 (I)	N/A	The Acte of Subsidye.	The whole act.
3 & 4 Phil. & Mar. c. 13 (I)	N/A	An Act declaring the Queen's Highnes to have bene born in most just and lawfull Matrimony, and also repeallinge all Acts of Parliament and Sentences of Divers, had and made to the contrarie.	The whole act.
2 Eliz. 1. c. 3 (I)	N/A	An Act for the Restitution of the First Fruits and XX Part and Rents reserved, nomine X or XX, and of Parsonages impropriate to the Imperial Crowne of this Realm.	The whole act.
2 Eliz. 1. c. 4 (I)	N/A	An Act for conferring and consecrating of Archbishops and Bishops within this Realme.	The whole act.
2 Eliz. 1. c. 5 (I)	N/A	An Act of Recognition of the Queene's Highnesse Title to the Imperial Crowne of this Realme.	The whole act.
2 Eliz. 1. c. 6 (I)	N/A	An Act whereby certaine Offences be made Treason.	Except Section Four.
11 Eliz. 1. c. 1 (I)	N/A	The Act of Subsidie granted to the Queen's Majestie.	The whole act.
11 Eliz. 1. c. 5 (I)	N/A	An Act for reviving the Statute against Gray Merchants; the Statute for Servants' Wages, and the Statute of Artificies.	The whole act.
11 Eliz. 1. c. 7 (I)	N/A	An Act that the Acte of retayninge of Scots shall not extende to the Governours of this Realme.	The whole act.
11 Eliz. 1. Sess. 2. c. 1 (I)	N/A	An Act the title of which begins with the words,—An Act authorising,—and ends with the words,—Poyning's Act.	The whole act.
11 Eliz. 1. Sess. 3. c. 2 (I)	N/A	An Act for making of the Trinitie Term shorter and for the Commencement thereof.	The whole act.
11 Eliz. 1. Sess. 3. c. 4 (I)	N/A	An Act for the Preservation of Salmon Frie and Ele Frie.	The whole act.
11 Eliz. 1. Sess. 3. c. 5 (I)	N/A	An Act against the laying of Hemp, Flax, and lymed Hydes in any fresh Waters or Rivers.	The whole act.
11 Eliz. 1. Sess. 3. c. 6 (I)	N/A	An Act authorising the Governour for ten years to come, to present to the dignities of Monster and Connacht.	The whole act.
11 Eliz. 1. Sess. 3. c. 7 (I)	N/A	An Act for taking away Captainships, and all Exactions belonging thereunto, from the Lords and Great Men of this Realm.	The whole act.
11 Eliz. 1. Sess. 3. c. 8 (I)	N/A	An Act the title of which begins with the words,—An Act that there be no Bill certified into England,—and ends with the words,—and Commons.	The whole act.
11 Eliz. 1. Sess. 3. c. 9 (I)	N/A	An Act for turning of Countries that be not yet Shire Grounds into Shire Grounds.	The whole act.
11 Eliz. 1. Sess. 3. c. 11 (I)	N/A	An Act giving order for bringing in of Wines into this Realm, where they shall be discharged, who shall rate the Prices of them, and also for Graunt of a Custom out of the same Wines.	The whole act.
13 Eliz. 1. c. 4 (I)	N/A	An Act authorising the Primas of Ardmagh to set his Landes and Possessions in the Irish Pale for Years without the Assent of his Chapiter.	The whole act.
28 Eliz. 1. c. 1 (I)	Perjury Act 1586	An Act concerning wilfull Perjurie.	Section One, so far as it relates to punishment of pillory. Section Two, so far as it relates to punishment of pillory, and from "in which " to end of that Section. Section Five.
28 Eliz. 1. c. 3 (I)	N/A	An Act against forging of Evidences, &c.	The whole act.
28 Eliz. 1. c. 5 (I)	N/A	An Act concerning the avoyding of fraudulent Conveyances made by the late Rebels in Ireland.	The whole act.
11, 12, & 13 Jas. 1. c. 1 (I)	N/A	A most joyfull and just Recognition of His Majestie's lawfull, undoubted, and absolute Right and Title to the Crown of Ireland.	The whole act.
11, 12, & 13 Jas. 1. c. 2 (I)	Piracy Act 1613	An Act for punishing of Pirats and Robbers on the Sea.	Section Three.
11, 12, & 13 Jas. 1. c. 5 (I)	N/A	An Act of Repeale of diverse Statutes concerning the Natives of this Kingdom of Ireland.	The whole act.
11, 12, & 13 Jas. 1. c. 6 (I)	N/A	An Act for Repeale of one Statute made against bringing in of Scotts, retayning of them, and marrying with them.	The whole act.
11, 12, & 13 Jas. 1. c. 9 (I)	N/A	An Act for the King's Majestie's most gracious, general, and free Pardon.	The whole act.
11, 12, & 13 Jas. 1. c. 12 (I) (Note: Also cited as 10 Chas. 1. c. 1 (I).)	N/A	An Act for the graunting of one entire Subsidie by the Temporaltye.	The whole act.
10 Chas. 1. c. 1 (I)	N/A	An Act for the grant of four entire Subsidies by the Temporalty.	The whole act.
10 Chas. 1. c. 2 (I)	N/A	An Act for the further granting of two entire Subsidies by the Temporalty above the four Subsidies now granted by this present Parliament.	The whole act.
10 Chas. 1. c. 4 (I)	Parliament Act 1634	An Act that this Session of Parliament shall not determine by his Majestie's Royal Assent to some Bills.	The whole act.
10 Chas. 1. Sess. 2. c. 1 (I)	Statute of Uses 1634	An Act expressing an Order for Uses, Wills, and Enrollments.	Sections Seven and Ten. Sections Eleven to "Herriots." Sections Twelve to Sixteen.
10 Chas. 1. Sess. 2. c. 3 (I)	N/A	An Act against covenous and fraudulent Conveyances.	Sections Six to Nine, Twelve, Thirteen.
10 Chas. 1. Sess. 2. c. 4 (I)	Conveyancing Act 1634	An Act concerning Grantees of Reversions, to take Advantage of Breaches of Conditions, &c.	Section Three.
10 Chas. 1. Sess. 2. c. 6 (I)	Trespass Act 1634	An Act for Limitation of Actions and for avoiding of Suites in Law.	Except Section Sixteen.
10 Chas. 1. Sess. 2. c. 7 (I)	N/A	An Act that wrongfull Disseizin, &c., is no Descent in Law.	The whole act.
10 Chas. 1. Sess. 2. c. 9 (I)	N/A	An Act touching Proclamations upon Fines.	The whole act.
10 Chas. 1. Sess. 2. c. 10 (I)	N/A	An Act for the Reformation of Errors in Fines and Recoveries.	The whole act.
10 Chas. 1. Sess. 2. c. 11 (I)	N/A	An Act for expedition of Justice.	The whole act.
10 Chas. 1. Sess. 2. c. 12 (I)	N/A	An Act for reformation of Jeofails, &c.	The whole act.
10 Chas. 1. Sess. 2. c. 14 (I)	N/A	An Act for the Continuance of Actions after the Death of any King.	Section Two.
10 Chas. 1. Sess. 2. c. 15 (I)	N/A	An Act that like Process shall be had in every Writ of Annuitie, and certain other Actions, as in an Action of Debt.	The whole act.
10 Chas. 1. Sess. 3. c. 1 (I)	N/A	An Act for Maintenance and Execution of Pious Uses.	The whole act.
10 Chas. 1. Sess. 3. c. 4 (I)	N/A	An Act for the Naturalization of all the Scottish Nation, which were Ante-Nati, born before His late Majestie King James of ever blessed Memorie, His happy accesse unto the Crown of England and Ireland, &c.	The whole act.
10 Chas. 1. Sess. 3. c. 5 (I)	N/A	An Act for Confirmation of Leases made by the Lord Primate and other Bishops in Ulster.	The whole act.
10 Chas. 1. Sess. 3. c. 6 (I)	N/A	An Act that Lessees shall enjoy their Fermes against Tenants in Taile, or in right of their Wives, &c.	The whole act.
10 Chas. 1. Sess. 3. c. 8 (I)	N/A	An Act for to avoyde unnecessary delayes of Execution.	The whole act.
10 Chas. 1. Sess. 3. c. 11 (I)	N/A	An Act for the avoyding of Recoveries suffered by Collusion by Tenants for Tearme of Life and such others.	The whole act.
10 Chas. 1. Sess. 3. c. 12 (I)	N/A	An Act for the avoyding of Secret Summons in Reall Actions.	The whole act.
10 Chas. 1. Sess. 3. c. 15 (I)	Maintenance and Embracery Act 1634	An Act against Maintenance, Embracery, &c., and against unlawful buying of Titles.	Section Two, from "in which Action" to end of that Section. Section Three, so far as it relates to Appropriation of Penalty, and from "in which Action" to end of that Section. Sections Five and Seven.
10 Chas. 1. Sess. 3. c. 18 (I)	Sheriffs Act 1634	An Act for the swearing of Under-sheriffs and other Officers.	Section Three.
10 Chas. 1. Sess. 3. c. 19 (I)	N/A	An Act to prevent Extortions in Sheriffes, Under-sheriffes, and Bayliffes of Franchises and Liberties in Cases of Execution.	The whole act.
10 Chas. 1. Sess. 3. c. 21 (I)	N/A	An Act the title of which begins with the words,—An Act whereby,—and ends with the word,—Kingdom.	The whole act.
10 Chas. 1. Sess. 3. c. 22 (I)	N/A	An Act to repeal a Statute made in the 12th yeare of King Edward the Fourth, concerning bringing Bowes into this Realme.	The whole act.
10 Chas. 1. Sess. 3. c. 23 (I)	N/A	An Act for the granting of eight entire Subsidies by the Prelates and Clergie of Ireland.	The whole act.
10 & 11 Chas. 1. c. 1 (I)	N/A	An Act to prevent and reform prophane Swearing and Cursing, &c.	The whole act.
10 & 11 Chas. 1. c. 2 (I)	N/A	An Act the title of which begins with the words,—An Act to enable Restitution,—and ends with the word,—Churches.	The whole act.
10 & 11 Chas. 1. c. 4 (I)	N/A	An Act for the erecting of Houses of Correction, and for the Punishment of Rogues, Vagabonds, Sturdy Beggers, and other Lewd and Idle Persons.	The whole act.
10 & 11 Chas. 1. c. 6 (I)	N/A	An Act for repeale of divers Statutes heretofore enacted in this Kingdom of Ireland.	The whole act.
10 & 11 Chas. 1. c. 7 (I)	N/A	An Act the title of which begins with the words,—An Act of Explanation,—and ends with the word,—sold.	Section Two.
10 & 11 Chas. 1. c. 13 (I)	N/A	An Act for the following of Hue-and-Cry.	The whole act.
10 & 11 Chas. 1. c. 14 (I)	N/A	An Act concerning errors in Records of Attainder of High Treason and Felonie.	The whole act.
10 & 11 Chas. 1. c. 16 (I)	N/A	An Act for the suppressing of Cosherers and Idle Wanderers.	The whole act.
10 & 11 Chas. 1. c. 18 (I)	N/A	An Act restraining the Abusive taking and distreyning for Herriots.	The whole act.
10 & 11 Chas. 1. c. 19 (I)	N/A	An Act for the King's Majesty's most gracious general and free Pardon.	The whole act.
15 Chas. 1. Sess. 2. c. 2 (I) (Note: Cited as 15 Car. 1. c. 2.)	N/A	An Act for abridging of Proclamations upon Fines, to be levied at the Common Law.	The whole act.
15 Chas. 1. Sess. 2. c. 4 (I) (Note: Cited as 15 Car. 1. c. 4.)	N/A	An Act touching the finding of Offices before the Escheator, &c.	The whole act.
15 Chas. 1. Sess. 2. c. 5 (I) (Note: Cited as 15 Car. 1. c. 5.)	N/A	An Act against Discontinuance of Writs of Error in the Court of Exchequer, and for further Expedition in giving Judgment therein.	The whole act.
15 Chas. 1. Sess. 2. c. 8 (I) (Note: Cited as 15 Car. 1. c. 8.)	N/A	An Act the title of which begins with the words,—An Act for punishing of Offenders,—and ends with the word,—Recognizance.	The whole act.
15 Chas. 1. Sess. 2. c. 10 (I) (Note: Cited as 15 Car. 1. c. 10.)	N/A	An Act for remedy of Errors and Defects in Fines and common Recoveries heretofore levied, acknowledged, and suffered.	The whole act.
15 Chas. 1. Sess. 2. c. 12 (I) (Note: Cited as 15 Car. 1. c. 12.)	N/A	An Act concerning 20th parts and other sums of Money payable by persons Ecclesiastical.	The whole act.
15 Chas. 1. Sess. 2. c. 13 (I)	N/A	An Act for the Grant of four intire Subsidies by the Temporalty.	The whole act.
15 Chas. 1. Sess. 2. c. 14 (I)	N/A	An Act that this Session of Parliament shall not determine by His Majestie's Royal Assent to this and some other Bills.	The whole act.
14 & 15 Chas. 2. c. 1 (I) (Note: Cited as 13 Car. 2. c. 1.)	Crown of Ireland Act 1662	An Act of Most joyful Recognition of His Majestie's undoubted Title to the Crown of Ireland.	The whole act.
14 & 15 Chas. 2. c. 2 (I) (Note: Cited as 13 Car. 2. c. 2.)	N/A	An Act for Confirmation of Judicial Proceedings.	The whole act.
14 & 15 Chas. 2. c. 3 (I) (Note: Cited as 13 Car. 2. c. 3.)	N/A	An Act for the Continuance of Process and Judicial Proceedings.	The whole act.
14 & 15 Chas. 2. c. 4 (I) (Note: Cited as 13 Car. 2. c. 4.)	Parliament Act 1662	An Act that this Session of Parliament shall not determine by His Majestie's Royal Assent to this or some other Bills.	The whole act.
14 & 15 Chas. 2 Sess. 2. c. 1 (I) (Note: Cited as 13 Car. 2 Sess. 2. c. 1.)	Revenue Act 1662	An Act for the speedy raising of Money for His Majestie's service.	The whole act.
14 & 15 Chas. 2 Sess. 2. c. 2 (I) (Note: Cited as 13 Car. 2 Sess. 2. c. 2.)	Parliament (No. 2) Act 1662	An Act that this nor any other Sessions of this Parliament determine by His Majestie's Royall Assent to this or any other Bill during this Session.	The whole act.
14 & 15 Chas. 2 Sess. 3. c. 1 (I)	N/A	An Act for the Continuance of the Customes, Excise, and New Impost to the five and twentieth day of March next.	The whole act.
14 & 15 Chas. 2 Sess. 4. c. 6 (I)	N/A	An Act for the Grant of Foure entire Subsidies by the Temporallity.	The whole act.
14 & 15 Chas. 2 Sess. 4. c. 7 (I)	N/A	An Act for the Graunts of Eight entire Subsidies by the Temporallitie.	The whole act.
14 & 15 Chas. 2 Sess. 4. c. 8 (I)	N/A	An Act for the Settling of the Excise or New Impost upon His Majestie, his Heires and Successors, according to the Book of Rates therein inserted.	The whole act.
14 & 15 Chas. 2 Sess. 4. c. 10 (I)	N/A	An Act for the Union and Division of Parishes and concerning Churches, Free Schools, and Exchanges.	Except Section Two so far as it relates to Free Schools and Exchanges.
14 & 15 Chas. 2 Sess. 4. c. 11 (I)	N/A	An Act for the Customs, Excise, and New Impost to be continued until the four and twentieth day of December, one thousand six hundred sixty and two.	The whole act.
14 & 15 Chas. 2 Sess. 4. c. 15 (I)	Parliament (No. 3) Act 1662	Act that this nor any other Sessions of this Parliament shall determine by His Majesties Royall Assent to this or any other Bill during this Session.	The whole act.
14 & 15 Chas. 2 Sess. 4. c. 17 (I)	N/A	An Act for establishing an additional Revenue upon His Majestie, his Heirs and Successors, for the better Support of his and their Crown and Dignity.	The whole act.
14 & 15 Chas. 2 Sess. 4. c. 18 (I)	N/A	An Act for the Improvement of his Majestie's Revenues upon the granting of Licenses for the selling of Ale and Beer.	The whole act.
14 & 15 Chas. 2 Sess. 4. c. 19 (I)	Tenures Abolition Act 1662	An Act for taking away the Court of Wards and Liveries and Tenures in Capite, and by Knights Service.	Sections Seventeen to Nineteen.
14 & 15 Chas. 2 Sess. 4. c. 22 (I)	N/A	An Act for the raising of twenty-three thousand and five hundred pounds sterling, for the severall Uses therein expressed.	The whole act.
14 & 15 Chas. 2 Sess. 4. c. 24 (I) (Note: Unknown.)	N/A	An Act for the granting of Eight Subsidies by the Prelats and Clergy of Ireland.	The whole act.
17 & 18 Chas. 2. c. 1 (I)	Subsidy Act 1665	An Act for the Grant of four entire Subsidies by the Temporalty.	The whole act.
17 & 18 Chas. 2. c. 3 (I)	Marriage Act 1665	An Act for the Confirmation of Marriages.	The whole act.
17 & 18 Chas. 2. c. 10 (I)	N/A	An Act for disabling of Spiritual Persons from holding Benefices or other Ecclesiastical Dignities in England or Wales and in Ireland at the same Time.	The whole act.
17 & 18 Chas. 2. c. 11 (I)	N/A	An Act to prevent Delays in extending Statutes, Judgments, and Recognizances.	Section Four.
17 & 18 Chas. 2. c. 12 (I)	N/A	An Act to prevent Arrests of Judgment and superseding Executions.	The whole act.
17 & 18 Chas. 2. c. 13 (I)	N/A	An Act concerning Tythings, Oblations, and Mortuaries.	The whole act.
17 & 18 Chas. 2. c. 17 (I)	N/A	An Act for granting Foure entire Subsidies by the Temporallitie for the defence of this His Majestie's Kingdome.	The whole act.
17 & 18 Chas. 2. c. 18 (I)	N/A	An additional Act for the better ordering and collecting the Revenue arising by Hearth-money.	The whole act.
17 & 18 Chas. 2. c. 19 (I)	N/A	An Act for the better ordering the selling of Wines and Aqua-vitæ, together with all sorts of strong waters by Retaile.	The whole act.
25 Car. 2. - (Note: Unknown)	N/A	Rules, Orders, and Directions, made and established by the Lord Lieutenant and Council for the better regulating the several Cities, Towns, and Corporations therein mentioned, and the electing of Magistrates and Officers therein.	The whole act.
4 Will. & Mar. c. 2 (I)	N/A	An Act for Encouragement of Protestant Strangers to settle in this Kingdom of Ireland.	The whole act.
4 Will. & Mar. c. 3 (I)	N/A	An Act for an additional Duty of Excise upon Beer, Ale, and other Liquors.	The whole act.
7 Will. 3. c. 1 (I)	N/A	An Act for an additional Duty of Excise upon Beer, Ale, and other Liquors.	The whole act.
7 Will. 3. c. 2 (I)	Ecclesiastical Jurisdiction Act 1695	An Act for taking away the Writ de heretico comburendo.	Section Two.
7 Will. 3. c. 4 (I)	N/A	An Act for better securing the Government by disarming Papists.	The whole act.
7 Will. 3. c. 9 (I)	N/A	An Act for the more effectual suppressing profane Cursing and Swearing.	Section Two from "and in case" to "hours." Section Three, the words "the one moyety to the use of the Informer"; and from "Wherein" to end of that Section. Section Six.
7 Will. 3. c. 10 (I)	N/A	An Act to take away Damage Clear.	The whole act.
7 Will. 3. c. 13 (I)	Sheriffs Act 1695	An Act for the more easy discharging of Sheriffs upon their Accounts, and from being Justices of the Peace.	Sections One and Two. Section Three so far as it relates to the appropriation of penalties, and from "Wherein" to end of that Section.
7 Will. 3. c. 14 (I)	N/A	An Act declaring which Days in the Year shall be observed as Holydays.	The whole act.
7 Will. 3. c. 15 (I)	N/A	An Act for granting a Supply to his Majesty by raising Money by a Poll and otherwise.	The whole act.
7 Will. 3. c. 16 (I)	N/A	An Act for granting to his Majesty an Aid or additional Custom on the several Goods and Merchandizes therein mentioned.	The whole act.
7 Will. 3. c. 17 (I)	Sunday Observance Act 1695	An Act for the better Observation of the Lord's Day, commonly called Sunday.	Section Six. Section Nine so far as it relates to the appropriation of penalties. Section Eleven.
7 Will. 3. c. 19 (I)	N/A	An Act for granting tales on Tryals to be had in the Court of the County Palatine of Tipperary before the Seneschal.	The whole act.
7 Will. 3. c. 20 (I)	N/A	An Act concerning Fines in the County Palatine of Tipperary.	The whole act.
7 Will. 3. c. 21 (I)	N/A	An Act for the better suppressing Tories, Robbers, and Rapparees, and for preventing Robberies, Burglaries, and other heinous Crimes.	The whole act.
7 Will. 3. c. 23 (I)	N/A	An Act for continuing the Statute for an additional Excise upon Beer, Ale, and other Liquors.	The whole act.
7 Will. 3. c. 25 (I)	N/A	An Act for the Prevention of Vexatious and Oppressions by Arrests, and of Delays in Suits of Law.	The whole act.
9 Will. 3. c. 1 (I)	Banishment Act 1697	An Act for banishing all Papists exercising any Ecclesiastical Jurisdiction, and all Regulars of the Popish Clergy out of this Kingdom.	The whole act.
9 Will. 3. c. 4 (I)	N/A	An Act the title of which begins with the words,—An Act for granting,—and ends with the words,—seven hundred and two.	The whole act.
9 Will. 3. c. 8 (I)	N/A	An Act for granting a Supply to His Majesty by raising Money by way of a Poll.	The whole act.
9 Will. 3. c. 9 (I)	N/A	An Act to supply the Defects, and for better Execution of an Act passed this present Session of Parliament, entitled "An Act for the better suppressing Tories and Rapparees, and for preventing Robberies, Burglaries, and other heinous Crimes."	The whole act.
9 Will. 3. c. 12 (I)	N/A	An Act for the more easy obtaining Partition of Lands in Coparcenary, Jointtenancy, and Tenancy in Common, and bounding and meering of Lands.	The whole act.
9 Will. 3. c. 13 (I)	Transferring Suits from Inferior Courts Act 1697	An Act for avoiding of vexatious Delays caused by removing Actions and Sutes out of inferior Courts.	Sections Five and Six.
9 Will. 3. c. 14 (I)	N/A	An Act for Redress of certain Abuses in making Pewter and Brass.	The whole act.
9 Will. 3. c. 17 (I)	N/A	An Act for erecting and continuing Lights in the City of Dublin, and the several liberties adjoining.	The whole act.
10 Will. 3. c. 1 (I)	N/A	An Act for the Relief and Release of poor distressed Prisoners for Debt or Damages.	The whole act.
10 Will. 3. c. 3 (I)	N/A	An Act for raising One hundred and twenty thousand Pounds on all Lands, Tenements, and Hereditaments in this Kingdom.	The whole act.
10 Will. 3. c. 4 (I)	N/A	An Act to compleat the Supply to His Majesty, and to build and finish the Barracks in this Kingdom.	The whole act.
10 Will. 3. c. 5 (I)	N/A	An Act for laying an additional Duty upon Woollen Manufactures exported out of this Kingdom.	The whole act.
10 Will. 3. c. 8 (I)	Deer Protection Act 1698	An Act for the preservation of the Game, and the more easy Conviction of such as shall destroy the same.	Section Two, so far as it relates to appropriation of penalty. Section Three, from "in which" to "impartiancy," and so far as it relates to appropriation of penalty. Section Four. Section Five, the words "being a Protestant," and so far as it relates to appropriation of penalty. Sections Six and Seven, so far as they relate to appropriation of penalties. Section Eight, to "wild fowl," and so far as it relates to appropriation of penalty. Sections Eleven to Fourteen, so far as they relate to the appropriation of penalties.
10 Will. 3. c. 13 (I)	N/A	An Act to prevent Papists being Solicitors.	The whole act.
2 Anne. c. 1 (I)	N/A	An Act for an additional Duty of Excise upon Beer, Ale, and other Liquors.	The whole act.
2 Anne. c. 3 (I)	N/A	An Act to prevent Popish Priests from coming into this Kingdom.	The whole act.
2 Anne. c. 4 (I)	N/A	An Act the title of which begins with the words,—An Act for continuing,—and ends with the words,—City of Dublin.	The whole act.
2 Anne. c. 6 (I)	Popery Act 1703	An Act to prevent the further Growth of Popery.	Section Twenty-five.
2 Anne. c. 7 (I)	Registration Act 1703	An Act for registering the Popish Clergy.	The whole act.
2 Anne. c. 9 (I)	N/A	An Act for quieting Ecclesiastical Persons in their Possessions.	The whole act.
2 Anne. c. 11 (I)	N/A	An Act for building several Parish Churches in more convenient Places.	The whole act.
2 Anne. c. 12 (I)	N/A	An Act for the reviving an Act for taking away the Benefit of Clergy in some cases, and for transporting Felons.	The whole act.
2 Anne. c. 13 (I)	N/A	An Act for continuing two Acts against Tories, Robbers, and Rapparees.	The whole act.
2 Anne. c. 15 (I)	Sale of Livestock Act 1703	An Act to prohibit Butchers from being Graziers, and to redress several Abuses in buying and selling of Cattle, and in the slaughtering and packing of Beef, Tallow, and Hides.	Section Six, from "and that no master," to "earnest as aforesaid," and so far as it relates to appropriation of penalty. Sections Eight and Eighteen.
2 Anne. c. 18 (I)	N/A	An Act for the recovery of Small Debts in a Summary way before the Judges of Assise.	The whole act.
4 Anne. c. 1 (I)	N/A	An Act for granting to Her Majesty an additional Duty on Beer, Ale, Strong Waters, Tobacco, Callicoes, Linnens, Muslins, and other Goods and Merchandizes.	The whole act.
4 Anne. c. 2 (I)	Registration Act 1705	An Act to explain and amend an Act intituled "An Act for registering the popish Clergy."	The whole act.
4 Anne. c. 3 (I)	N/A	An Act to repeal an Act intituled "An Act for the Advancement of the Trade of Linnen Manufacture."	The whole act.
4 Anne. c. 8 (I)	Tolls Act 1705	An Act to regulate the taking and exacting Tolls throughout this Kingdom, and to prevent engrossing Coals in the City of Dublin.	Section Four, from "in which" to end of that section. Section Ten, from "This Act" to end of that section.
4 Anne. c. 10 (I)	N/A	An Act to prevent Fees being taken in certain Cases.	The whole act.
4 Anne. c. 11 (I)	Sale of Horses Act 1705	An Act against Horse-stealing, and to prevent the buying and selling of stolen Horses, and for punishing all Accessories to Felons.	Section Four, so far as it relates to appropriation of penalties. Section Six, from "This Act" to the end of that Section.
4 Anne. c. 12 (I)	State Minerals Act 1705	An Act to repeal the Statute made in the Fifth of Henry the Fourth against multiplying Gold and Silver; and to prevent Disputes and Controversies concerning Royal Mines.	Sections One and Five to the end of the Act.
4 Anne. c. 13 (I)	N/A	An Act for the Relief of poor Prisoners for Debt.	The whole act.
4 Anne. c. 14 (I)	Weights and Measures Act 1705	An Act for regulating the Weights used in this Kingdom; and that Salt and Meal shall be sold by Weight.	Section Eight, so far as it relates to appropriation of penalties. Sections Nine and Fifteen.
6 Anne. c. 1 (I)		An Act for granting to Her Majesty an additional Duty on Beer, Ale, Strong Waters, Tobacco, Callicoes, Linens, Muslins, and other Goods and Merchandizes.	The whole act.
6 Anne. c. 3 (I)		An Act for continuing an Act made in the Ninth Year of the late King William, intituled "An Act for the more easy obtaining Partitions of Lands in Coparcenary, Joint-tenancy, and Tenancy in common, and bounding and mearing of Lands."	The whole act.
6 Anne. c. 5 (I)		An Act for the amending and continuing an Act made in the Second Year of the Reign of Her Most Excellent Majesty, intituled "An Act for the Recovery of Small Debts in a Summary Way before the Judges of Assize."	The whole act.
6 Anne. c. 6 (I)		An Act to explain and amend an Act, intituled "An Act to prevent Papists being Solicitors."	The whole act.
6 Anne. c. 10 (I)	Administration of Justice Act 1707	An Act for the Amendment of the Law, and the better Advancement of Justice.	Sections Fifteen and Sixteen; and Section Twenty-one, from "and shall" to "Engrossery."
6 Anne. c. 12 (I)	N/A	An Act for the continuing and perpetuating of divers Laws and Statutes heretofore temporary, and for amending of the Law in relation to Butter Casks.	Section One, the words "An Act for lessening the Duty on Rape Seed to be exported, and also one other Act intituled."
6 Anne. c. 13 (I)	N/A	An Act to impower Justices of the Peace to determine Disputes about Servants' Wages, and to oblige Masters to pay the same, and to punish idle and disorderly Servants.	The whole act.
6 Anne. c. 14 (I)	N/A	An Act to prevent the Disorders that may happen by the marching of Soldiers, and for providing Carriages for the Baggage of Soldiers in their March.	Section Three, from Seven to Section Nine; Section Ten, so far as it relates to the appropriation of penalties.
6 Anne. c. 17 (I)	Lotteries and Gaming-Tables Act 1707	An Act for suppressing Lotteries and Gaming Tables.	Section One, from "other than" to "longer"; Section Two, so far as it relates to appropriation of penalty.
6 Anne. c. 18 (I)	N/A	An Act for encouraging the Exportation of Corn.	The whole act.
8 Anne. c. 1 (I)	N/A	An Act for the better securing to Her Majesty the Payment of such Duties as shall be granted to Her Majesty this Session of Parliament.	The whole act.
8 Anne. c. 2 (I)	N/A	An Act for granting to Her Majesty an additional Duty on Beer, Ale, Strong Waters, Callicoes, Linnens, and other Goods and Merchandizes, and also a Duty on Rock Salt.	The whole act.
8 Anne. c. 4 (I)	N/A	An Act to enable Posthumous Children to take Estates as if born in their Fathers' Lifetime.	Section Two.
8 Anne. c. 5 (I)	N/A	An Act to prevent Delays of Proceedings at the Assizes and Sessions.	Section Five.
8 Anne. c. 7 (I)	N/A	An Act for the better preventing Escapes out of the Prison of the Marshalsea of the Four Courts.	The whole act.
9 Anne. c. 1 (I)	N/A	An Act for the better securing to Her Majesty the Payment of such Duties as shall be granted to Her Majesty this Session of Parliament.	The whole act.
9 Anne. c. 2 (I)	N/A	An Act for granting to Her Majesty an additional Duty on Beer, Ale, Strong Waters, Tobacco, and other Goods and Merchandizes.	The whole act.
9 Anne. c. 6 (I)	Criminal Evidence Act 1710	An Act for taking away the Benefit of Clergy in certain Cases; and for taking away the Book in all Cases; and for repealing part of the Statutes for transporting Felons.	Section Eight.
9 Anne. c. 7 (I)	N/A	An Act for amending and making perpetual an Act, intituled "An Act to prohibit Butchers from being Graziers, and to redress several Abuses in buying and selling of Cattle, and in the slaughtering and packing of Beef, Tallow, and Hides."	Section One, so far as it relates to appropriation of penalty. Section Two.
9 Anne. c. 8 (I)	N/A	An Act for the better securing of Rents, and to prevent Frauds committed by Tenants.	Sections Three, Four, Six.
9 Anne. c. 10 (I)	N/A	An Act for the Relief of Insolvent Debtors now in Confinement.	The whole act.
9 Anne. c. 11 (I)	N/A	An Act to prevent the maiming of Cattle.	The whole act.
11 Anne. c. 1 (I)	N/A	An Act for granting to Her Majesty an additional Duty on Beer, Ale, Strong Waters, Tobacco, and other Goods and Merchandizes.	The whole act.
11 Anne. c. 4 (I)	N/A	An Act for the more effectual preventing the Ingrossing, Forestalling, and Regrating of Coals imported into this Kingdom.	The whole act.
11 Anne. c. 6 (I)	Lotteries Act 1712	An Act for suppressing Lotteries.	Section Two, so far as it relates to the appropriation of penalties. Section Three, from "whereas" to "allowed," and so far as it relates appropriation of penalties.
11 Anne. c. 8 (I)	Sheriffs Act 1712	An Act for explaining and amending several Statutes for prohibiting Under-Sheriffs and Sheriffs Clerks from officiating as Sub-Sheriffs or Sheriffs Clerks more than one year.	Sections Two and Four; Section Five so far as it relates to appropriation of penalty. Section Six.
2 Geo. 1. c. 1	N/A	An Act for granting to His Majesty an additional Duty on Beer, Ale, Strong Waters, Tobacco, and other Goods and Merchandizes.	The whole act.
2 Geo. 1. c. 2	N/A	An Act for recognizing His Majesty's Title to the Throne of Great Britain, France, and Ireland.	The whole act.
2 Geo. 1. c. 3	N/A	An Act for granting to His Majesty an additional Duty on all Wines and Strong Waters, and Spirits perfectly made, and on all Spirits made and distilled of Wine; and also a Tax on Sallaries, Profits of Imployments, Fees, and Pensions therein mentioned.	The whole act.
2 Geo. 1. c. 4	N/A	An Act the title of which begins with the words,—An Act to attaint,—and ends with the words,—attempts to land in this Kingdom.	The whole act.
2 Geo. 1. c. 5	Accidental Fires Act 1715	An Act for preventing Mischiefs that may happen by Fire.	Section Four.
2 Geo. 1. c. 7	N/A	An Act for continuing to His Majesty the additional Duty on Beer, Ale, Strong Waters, Tobacco, and other Goods and Merchandizes.	The whole act.
2 Geo. 1. c. 8	County Palatine of Tipperary Act 1715	An Act the title of which begins with the words,—An Act for extinguishing the Regalities and Liberties of the County of Tipperary,—and ends with the words,—in this Kingdom.	Section Four to the end of the Act.
2 Geo. 1. c. 12	N/A	An Act to encourage the draining and improving the Bogs and unprofitable Low Grounds, and for easing and dispatching the Inland Carriage and the conveyance of Goods from one part to another within this Kingdom.	The whole act.
2 Geo. 1. c. 14	N/A	An Act for real Union and Division of Parishes.	The whole act.
2 Geo. 1. c. 16	Packing of Tallow Act 1715	An Act the title of which begins with the words,—An Act for the more General Amendment of the Law in relation to Butter,—and ends with the words,—Tallow and Hides.	Sections Five and Six, so far as they relate to appropriation of penalties. Section Eight; Section Nine, so far as it relates to appropriation of penalty, and from "and in case" to "convicted shall be."
2 Geo. 1. c. 17	Servants Act 1715	An Act to impower Justices of the Peace to determine Disputes about Servants, Artificers, Day Labourers, Wages, and other small Demands, and to oblige Masters to pay the same, and to punish idle and disorderly Servants.	Section Two, from "put such" to "six hours, or"; Section Three, from "or put" to the end of that section; Section Five, from "and whip" to the end of that section; Section Six, so far as it relates to appropriation of penalty; Section Seven, from "and also" to the end of that section; Section Eight; Sections Eleven to Fourteen; Section Fifteen, from "or to put" to "complained of"; Sections Twenty to Twenty-three.
2 Geo. 1. c. 18	N/A	An Act for preventing Abuses and Deceits in His Majesty's Revenue, by the importing of Brandy in small quantities.	The whole act.
2 Geo. 1. c. 19	N/A	An Act for the more effectual preventing fraudulent Conveyances in order to multiply votes for electing Members to serve in Parliament, and for preventing the irregular Proceedings of Sheriffs and other officers in electing and returning such Members.	Section Nine.
2 Geo. 1. c. 20	Slander Act 1715	An Act to limit the Time for criminal Prosecutions for words spoken.	Section Four.
2 Geo. 1. c. 23	Relief of Insolvent Debtors Act 1715	An Act for the Relief of Insolvent Debtors.	The whole act.
2 Geo. 1. c. 24	St. Werburgh's Church Act 1715	An Act for changing the Scite and new Building of the Parish Church of St. Werburgh's, in the City of Dublin.	The whole act.
4 Geo. 1. c. 1	N/A	An Act for continuing to His Majesty the additional Duties on Beer, Ale, Strong Waters, Tobacco, and other Goods and Merchandizes.	The whole act.
4 Geo. 1. c. 2	N/A	An Act the title of which begins with the words,—An Act for continuing to His Majesty an additional,—and ends with the words,—Interest thereof.	The whole act.
4 Geo. 1. c. 3	N/A	An Act for taking away the Oath, commonly called the Little Oath, on Members of Corporations by the new Rules.	The whole act.
4 Geo. 1. c. 7	N/A	An Act the title of which begins with the words,—An Act for vesting,—and ends with the words,—Soldiers in their march.	Sections One, Two, Six.
4 Geo. 1. c. 8	N/A	An Act to oblige all Officers to return a List of their Fees by a Day certain.	Section One.
4 Geo. 1. c. 9	N/A	An Act for reviving, continuing, and amending several Statutes made in this Kingdom heretofore temporary.	Section Six to the end of the Act.
4 Geo. 1. c. 10	N/A	An Act for limiting certain Times within which Writs of Error shall be brought for the reversing Fines and Common Recoveries.	The whole act.
4 Geo. 1. c. 11	N/A	An Act for the better Amendment of the Pavements, and more effectual cleansing the Streets of the City of Dublin, and for removing Encroachments or Nuisances that are or shall be erected therein, and preventing Mischiefs occasioned by Drivers of Carts, Drays, or Cars filing thereof, and for better regulating the selling of Hay in the City of Dublin and Liberties thereunto adjoining.	The whole act.
6 Geo. 1. c. 1	N/A	An Act for abbreviating Michaelmas Term and settling the Commencement thereof.	The whole act.
6 Geo. 1. c. 3	Militia Act 1719	An Act for continuing and amending an Act, intituled "An Act to make the Militia of this Kingdom more useful."	The whole act.
6 Geo. 1. c. 4	N/A	An Act the title of which begins with the words,—An Act for continuing to His Majesty the additional Duties on Beer,—and ends with the words,—the Interest thereof.	The whole act.
6 Geo. 1. c. 5	Toleration Act 1719	An Act for exempting the Protestant Dissenters of this Kingdom from certain Penalties to which they are now subject.	Sections Four to Seven, and Fifteen.
6 Geo. 1. c. 6	N/A	An Act to prevent Delays in Writs of Error, and for the further Amendment of the Law.	Sections Five to Seventeen.
6 Geo. 1. c. 10	N/A	An Act for the better regulating the Parish Watches and amending the Highways in this Kingdom; and for the preventing the Misapplication of Publick Money.	The whole act.
6 Geo. 1. c. 11	Benefices Act 1719	An Act for better securing the Rights of Advowson and Presentation to Ecclesiastical Benefices.	The whole act.
6 Geo. 1. c. 12	N/A	An Act for the better and more effectual apprehending and transporting Felons and others; and for continuing and amending several Laws made in this Kingdom for suppressing Tories, Robbers, and Rapparees.	The whole act.
6 Geo. 1. c. 13	N/A	An Act for the better Maintenance of Curates within the Church of Ireland.	The whole act.
6 Geo. 1. c. 14	N/A	An Act for amending and enforcing a Clause contained in an Act to enable Restitution of Impropriations, and Tithes and other Rights ecclesiastical to the Clergy, with a Restraint of aliening the same, and Direction for Presentation to the Churches.	The whole act.
6 Geo. 1. c. 15	N/A	An Act for the more effectual Amendment of the Pavements of the several Counties of Cities and Counties of Towns in this Kingdom; and for preventing Mischiefs that may happen by Fire in the City of Dublin; and for regulating the Number of Hackney Coaches and Chairs in the said City.	Section Five, and Sections Ten to Thirteen.
6 Geo. 1. c. 17	Relief of Insolvent Debtors Act 1719	An Act for the Relief of Insolvent Debtors.	The whole act.
6 Geo. 1. c. 18 (I)	N/A	An Act for erecting and continuing Lights in the City of Dublin and the several Liberties adjoining; and also in the Cities of Cork and Limerick, and	The whole act.
8 Geo. 1. c. 1	N/A	An Act the title of which begins with the words,—An Act for granting and continuing to His Majesty the additional Duties,—and ends with the words,—Interest thereof.	The whole act.
8 Geo. 1. c. 3	Quarantine Act (Ireland) 1721	An Act to oblige Ships coming from infected Places more effectually to perform their Quarantine; and for the better preventing the Plague being brought from Foreign Parts into this Kingdom.	The whole act.
8 Geo. 1. c. 5	Boundaries Act 1721	An Act to oblige Proprietors and Tenants of neighbouring Lands to make Fences between their several Lands and Holdings.	Section One, from "before the Justices of Assize" to "the said county."
8 Geo. 1. c. 6	N/A	An Act for the further Amendment of the Law; and for continuing and amending several Acts near expiring.	Sections Two, Seven, Eight, and Ten to Twelve.
8 Geo. 1. c. 7	N/A	An Act for the further Amendment of the Laws in relation to Butter and Tallow Casks, Hides, and other Commodities of this Kingdom, and for preventing the Destruction of Salmon.	The whole act.
8 Geo. 1. c. 9	N/A	An Act the title of which begins with the words,—An Act for amending an Act, intituled "An Act for the better and more effectual apprehending and transporting Felons,"—and ends with the words,—His Majesty's Licence.	The whole act.
8 Geo. 1. c. 10	N/A	An Act for continuing and amending an Act, intituled "An Act for the better regulating the Parish Watches and amending the Highways in this Kingdom"; and for preventing the Misapplication of Public Money.	The whole act.
8 Geo. 1. c. 12	N/A	An Act for the better enabling of the Clergy having Cure of Souls to reside upon their respective Benefices, and for the Encouragement of Protestant Schools within this Kingdom of Ireland.	Sections Nine and Ten.
8 Geo. 1. c. 15	Registration of Deeds Act 1721	An Act for explaining and amending Two several Acts in relation to the Publick Registering of all Deeds, Conveyances, and Wills.	Section Three, from "or such" to "taken."
8 Geo. 1. c. 16	N/A	An Act for amending an Act, intituled "Act for erecting Lights in the City of Dublin and the several Liberties adjoining; and also in the Cities of Cork and Limerick, and Liberties thereof."	The whole act.
10 Geo. 1. c. 1	N/A	An Act the title of which begins with the words,—An Act for granting,—and ends with the words,—Interest thereof.	The whole act.
10 Geo. 1. c. 3	N/A	An Act for continuing and amending an Act, intituled "An Act for the better regulating the Parish Watches and amending the Highways in this Kingdom; and for preventing the Misapplication of Public Money; and also for establishing a regular Watch in the City of Dublin; and to prevent Mischiefs which may happen by graving Ships in the River Liffey."	The whole act.
10 Geo. 1. c. 4	N/A	An Act for continuing several temporary Statutes made in this Kingdom, and now near expiring.	The whole act.
10 Geo. 1. c. 6	N/A	An Act the title of which begins with the words,—An Act for explaining and amending an Act, intituled "An Act for real Union and Division of Parishes,"—and ends with the words,—the same uses.	The whole act.
10 Geo. 1. c. 8	N/A	An Act for accepting the solemn Affirmation or Declaration of the people called Quakers, in certain cases, instead of an Oath in the usual Form.	The whole act.
10 Geo. 1. c. 9	N/A	An Act for continuing and amending of the Laws in relation to Butter and Tallow, and the Casks in which such goods are to be made up, and in relation to the curing of Hides, and making up of Beef and Pork for Exportation; and for preventing the Destruction of Salmon.	The whole act.
10 Geo. 1. c. 10	Sale of Livestock Act 1723	An Act for regulating Abuses committed in buying and selling of Cattle and Sheep in the several Markets in this Kingdom.	Section One, so far as it relates to appropriation of penalty, and from "and that any person" to the end of the section; Section Four, from "and paid" to the end of the section; Sections Seven and Eight.
10 Geo. 1. c. 11	Relief of Insolvent Debtors Act 1723	An Act for the Relief of Insolvent Debtors.	The whole act.
12 Geo. 1. c. 1	N/A	An Act the title of which begins with the words,—An Act for granting and continuing to His Majesty the additional Duties on Beer,—and ends with the words,—Interest thereof.	The whole act.
12 Geo. 1. c. 2	N/A	An Act to prevent the fraudulent and clandestine importing of Goods.	The whole act.
12 Geo. 1. c. 3	Marriage Act 1725	An Act to prevent Marriages by Degraded Clergymen and Popish Priests; and for preventing Marriages consumated from being avoided by pre-contracts; and for the more effectual punishing of Bigamy.	Sections Two and Three.
12 Geo. 1. c. 4	Sheriffs Act 1725	An Act for the better regulating the office of Sheriffs, and for the ascertaining their Fees, and the Fees for suing out their Patents and passing their Accounts.	Section One; Section Seven, so far as it relates to appropriation of penalty, and from "in which" to "imparlance"; Section Fifteen; and the Schedule.
12 Geo. 1. c. 5	N/A	An Act for explaining and amending an Act, intituled "An Act for continuing and amending the Laws in relation to Butter and Tallow, and the Casks in which such Goods are to be made up, and in relation to the curing of Hides, and in making up of Beef and Pork for Exportation; and for preventing the Destruction of Salmon."	The whole act.
12 Geo. 1. c. 6	N/A	An Act for continuing several temporary Statutes made in this Kingdom, now near expiring; and for allowing further time to Persons in offices to qualify themselves pursuant to an Act, intituled "An Act to prevent the further Growth of Popery."	The whole act.
12 Geo. 1. c. 8	N/A	An Act for the more effectual transporting Felons and Vagabonds.	The whole act.
12 Geo. 1. c. 9	N/A	An Act for the more effectual erecting and better regulating of Free Schools, and for rebuilding and repairing of Churches.	The whole act.
12 Geo. 1. c. 10	Glebe Act 1725	An Act to amend and explain an Act, intituled "An Act to encourage building of Houses and other Improvements on Church Lands, and to prevent Dilapidations."	Section Twelve to the end of the Act.
1 Geo. 2. c. 1	N/A	An Act the title of which begins with the words,—An Act for granting and continuing to His Majesty the additional Duties on Beer,—and ends with the words,—and Cocoa Nuts.	The whole act.
1 Geo. 2. c. 4	N/A	An Act the title of which begins with the words,—An Act for granting to His Majesty an additional Duty on Beer,—and ends with the words,—Interest thereof.	The whole act.
1 Geo. 2. c. 5	N/A	An Act for accepting the solemn Affirmation or Declaration of the People called Quakers, instead of an Oath in the usual Form.	The whole act.
1 Geo. 2. c. 6	N/A	An Act for the more effectual preventing several Frauds and Abuses committed in His Majesty's Customs and Excise, and for settling the Rates of certain Goods and Merchandizes not particularly valued in the Book of Rates.	The whole act.
1 Geo. 2. c. 7	N/A	An Act to continue the Parliament for the time being on the Demise of His present most Gracious Majesty, or any of his Heirs or Successors, for the Term of Six Months from the Day of the said Demise; and likewise to prevent the Publick Funds from expiring during the said Term.	The whole act.
1 Geo. 2. c. 8	Privilege of Parliament Act 1727	An Act for preventing Inconveniences that may happen by Privilege of Parliament.	The last Section.
1 Geo. 2. c. 9	N/A	An Act for the better regulating the Election of Members of Parliament, and preventing the irregular Proceedings of Sheriffs and other Officers in electing and returning such Members.	The whole act.
1 Geo. 2. c. 12	N/A	An Act for the more easy Recovery of Tythes and other Ecclesiastical Dues of small Value.	The whole act.
1 Geo. 2. c. 15	N/A	An Act for rendering more effectual an Act, intituled "An Act for the better enabling of the Clergy having Cure of Souls to reside upon their respective Benefices, and for the Encouragement of Protestant Schools within this Kingdom of Ireland."	The whole act.
1 Geo. 2. c. 16	N/A	An Act for regulating the Price and Assize of Bread and the Markets.	The whole act.
1 Geo. 2. c. 17	N/A	An Act for continuing several temporary Statutes made in this Kingdom, now near expiring.	The whole act.
1 Geo. 2. c. 18	N/A	An Act the title of which begins with the words,—An Act to enable Archbishops, Bishops, and other Ecclesiastical Persons and Corporations to grant their Patronages,—and ends with the words,—improving thereof.	Sections Seventeen and Eighteen.
1 Geo. 2. c. 19	N/A	An Act for repealing a Clause in an Act, intituled "An Act for real Union and Division of Parishes," and for settling the Method of obtaining the King's Majesty's Consent for removing the Situation of Churches, the Patronage whereof is in the Crown.	The whole act.
1 Geo. 2. c. 22	N/A	An Act for explaining and amending an Act, intituled "An Act for the better Maintenance of Curates within the Church of Ireland."	Sections Two and Three.
1 Geo. 2. c. 23		An Act for the better securing the Rights of Advowson and Presentation to Ecclesiastical Benefices.	The whole act.
1 Geo. 2. c. 25	Relief of Insolvent Debtors Act 1727	An Act for the Relief of Insolvent Debtors.	The whole act.
1 Geo. 2. c. 26	N/A	An Act for the more speedy and effectual inclosing the Strand on the North Side of the River Anna-Liffey, near the city of Dublin.	The whole act.
1 Geo. 2. c. 27	N/A	An Act for the better regulating the Workhouse of the City of Dublin, and to regulate and provide for the Poor thereof; and to prevent Mischiefs which may happen by keeping Gun-powder within the said City.	Sections Thirty-one to Thirty-four.
3 Geo. 2. c. 1	N/A	An Act for granting and continuing to His Majesty an additional Duty on Beer, Ale, Strong Waters, Wine, Tobacco, and other Goods and Merchandizes therein mentioned.	The whole act.
3 Geo. 2. c. 2	N/A	An Act the title of which begins with the words,—An Act for granting to His Majesty a further additional Duty on Wine,—and ends with the words,—principal Sum.	The whole act.
3 Geo. 2. c. 3	N/A	An Act the title of which begins with the words,—An Act for the Encouragement of Tillage,—and ends with the words,—out of this Kingdom to England.	The whole act.
3 Geo. 2. c. 4	Perjury Act 1729	An Act for more effectual preventing and further Punishment of Forgery, Perjury, and Subornation of Perjury, and to make it Felony to steal Bonds, Notes, or other Securities for Payment of Money, and for the more effectual transporting Felons, Vagabonds, and others.	Sections Four to Eight.
3 Geo. 2. c. 5	N/A	An Act for continuing several temporary Statutes made in this Kingdom, and now near expiring, and for the Amendment of other Statutes therein mentioned.	The whole act.
3 Geo. 2. c. 6	N/A	An Act for allowing further time to Persons in Offices to qualify themselves pursuant to an Act, intituled "An Act to prevent the further Growth of Popery."	The whole act.
3 Geo. 2. c. 7	N/A	An Act for the better Discovery of Judgments in the Courts of King's Bench, Common Pleas, and Exchequer at Dublin; and for the greater Security of Purchasers.	The whole act.
3 Geo. 2. c. 8	Parliament House Act 1729	An Act to enable His Majesty to purchase in the respective Interests of the several Persons intitled to the Ground adjoining to the new Parliament House.	The whole act.
3 Geo. 2. c. 9	Sheriffs Act 1729	An Act the title of which begins with the words,—An Act for the further explaining and amending several Statutes for prohibiting Under-Sheriffs,—and ends with the words,—unable to pay their Fees.	Section One; Sections Two and Three, the words "wherein no essoin, imparlance, protection, or wager of law shall be allowed." Sections Five to Seven.
3 Geo. 2. c. 10	N/A	An Act for explaining and amending an Act, intituled "An Act to prevent the Disorders that may happen by the marching of Soldiers, and for providing Carriages for the Baggage of Soldiers on their March."	The whole act.
3 Geo. 2. c. 11	N/A	An Act for better keeping Churches in Repair.	The whole act.
3 Geo. 2. c. 14	N/A	An Act to prevent unlawful Combinations of Workmen, Artificers, and Labourers, employed in the several Trades and Manufactures of this Kingdom, and for the better Payment of their Wages; as also to prevent Abuses in making of Bricks, and to ascertain their Dimensions.	Sections One to Six.
3 Geo. 2. c. 15	Trial of Criminals Act 1729	An Act for the more speedy Tryal of Criminals in the County of the City of Dublin, and County of Dublin.	Section Three, from "the gaol" to "and that."
3 Geo. 2. c. 16	N/A	An Act for the better regulating the Fees of Justices of the Peace, and for disabling Alderman Thomas Wilkinson and Alderman Thomas Bolton from acting as Justices of the Peace within this Kingdom.	The whole act.
3 Geo. 2. c. 20	Relief of Insolvent Debtors Act 1729	An Act for the relief of Insolvent Debtors.	The whole act.
3 Geo. 2. c. 22	N/A	An Act for explaining and amending an Act made in the Sixth Year of the Reign of His late Majesty King George the First, intituled "An Act for erecting and continuing Lights in the City of Dublin, and the several Liberties adjoining; and also in the Cities of Cork and Limerick, and Liberties thereof."	The whole act.
5 Geo. 2. c. 1	N/A	An Act for granting and continuing to His Majesty an additional Duty on Beer, Ale, Strong Waters, Wine, Tobacco, and other Goods and Merchandizes therein mentioned.	The whole act.
5 Geo. 2. c. 2	N/A	An Act the title of which begins with the words,—An Act for granting to His Majesty a further additional Duty on Wine,—and ends with the words,—Principal Sum.	The whole act.
5 Geo. 2. c. 3	Revenue Act 1731	An Act for the better securing and collecting His Majesty's Revenue.	The whole act.
5 Geo. 2. c. 4	Security of Trade Act 1731	An Act for the further explaining and amending the several Laws for preventing Frauds committed by Tenants; and for the more easy Renewal of Leases; and for the further Amendment of the Law in certain Cases therein mentioned.	Sections, Five, Six, and Nine.
5 Geo. 2. c. 5	N/A	An Act for allowing further Time to Persons in Offices to qualify themselves pursuant to an Act, intituled "An Act to prevent the further Growth of Popery."	The whole act.
5 Geo. 2. c. 6	N/A	An Act for continuing several temporary Statutes made in this Kingdom, and now near expiring, and for the Amendment of the Statutes therein mentioned.	The whole act.
5 Geo. 2. c. 9	Land Improvement Act 1731	An Act to encourage the Improvement of barren and waste Land and Bogs, and planting of Timber Trees and Orchards.	Sections Six to Eight.
5 Geo. 2. c. 13	N/A	An Act for the better Regulation and Government of Seamen in the Merchants' Service.	The whole act.
7 Geo. 2. c. 1	N/A	An Act for granting and continuing to His Majesty an additional Duty on Beer, Ale, Strong Waters, Wine, Tobacco, and other Goods and Merchandizes therein mentioned.	The whole act.
7 Geo. 2. c. 2	N/A	An Act the title of which begins with the words,—An Act for granting to His Majesty a further additional Duty on Wine,—and ends with the words,—Principal Sum.	The whole act.
7 Geo. 2. c. 3	N/A	An Act the title of which begins with the words,—An Act for continuing and amending an Act, intituled "An Act for the more effectual preventing several Frauds,"—and ends with the words,—Collection thereof.	The whole act.
7 Geo. 2. c. 4	N/A	An Act for allowing further Time to Persons in Offices or Employments to qualify themselves pursuant to an Act, intituled "An Act to prevent the further Growth of Popery."	The whole act.
7 Geo. 2. c.	Solicitors Act 1733	An Act for the Amendment of the Law in relation to Popish Solicitors; and for remedying other mischiefs in relation to the Practitioners in the several Courts of Law and Equity.	Except Section Nine, so far as relates to Attorneys or Solicitors.
7 Geo. 2. c. 6	N/A	An Act to prevent Persons converted from the Popish to the Protestant Religion, and married to Popish Wives, or educating their Children in the Popish Religion, from acting as Justices of the Peace.	The whole act.
7 Geo. 2. c. 7	N/A	An Act for continuing several temporary Statutes, and for other Purposes therein mentioned.	The whole act.
7 Geo. 2. c. 9	Spinners Act 1733	An Act to prevent Frauds and Abuses in Bay Yarn exported to Great Britain.	Sections One, Two, and Six.
7 Geo. 2. c. 12	N/A	An Act the title of which begins with the words,—An Act to enable the Commissioners appointed to put in execution an Act for the Encouragement of Tillage,—and ends with the words,—Administrators.	The whole act.
7 Geo. 2. c. 13	N/A	An Act to encourage the Home Consumption of Wool, by burying in Woollen only.	The whole act.
7 Geo. 2. c. 14	Relief of Mortgages Act 1733	An Act the title of which begins with the words,—An Act for the Relief of Mortgagees,—and ends with the words,—Solicitors.	Section Seven.
7 Geo. 2. c. 15	N/A	An Act the title of which begins with the words,—An Act for the buying and selling of all Sorts of Corn,—and ends with the words,—Markets.	The whole act.
7 Geo. 2. c. 17	N/A	An Act the title of which begins with the words,—An Act for making more effectual an Act,—and ends with the words,—Queen's County.	The whole act.
9 Geo. 2. c. 1	N/A	An Act for granting and continuing to His Majesty an additional Duty on Beer, Ale, Strong Waters, Wine, Tobacco, and other Goods and Merchandizes therein mentioned.	The whole act.
9 Geo. 2. c. 2	N/A	An Act the title of which begins with the words,—An Act for granting to His Majesty a further additional Duty on Wine,—and ends with the words,—Principal Sum.	The whole act.
9 Geo. 2. c. 3	N/A	An Act for the better regulating of Juries.	The whole act.
9 Geo. 2. c. 5	N/A	An Act for the more effectual assigning of Judgments, and for the more speedy Recovery of Rents by Distress.	The whole act.
9 Geo. 2. c. 6	N/A	An Act for continuing and amending several Statutes now near expiring.	Sections One to Four, Six to Nine, and Eleven.
9 Geo. 2. c. 10	N/A	An Act for preventing Frauds and Abuses committed in the making and vending unsound, adulterated, and bad Drugs and Medicines.	The whole act.
9 Geo. 2. c. 16	N/A	An Act for accepting the solemn Affirmation or Declaration of the People called Quakers, instead of an Oath in the usual Form.	The whole act.
9 Geo. 2. c. 20	Insolvent Debtors Relief Act 1735	An Act for the Relief of Insolvent Debtors.	The whole act.
11 Geo. 2. c. 1	N/A	An Act for granting and continuing to His Majesty an additional Duty on Beer, Ale, Strong Waters, Wine, Tobacco, and other Goods and Merchandizes therein mentioned.	The whole act.
11 Geo. 2. c. 2	N/A	An Act the title of which begins with the words,—An Act for granting to His Majesty a further additional Duty on Wine,—and ends with the words,—Principal Sum.	The whole act.
11 Geo. 2. c. 3	N/A	An Act for continuing and amending several Laws heretofore made relating to His Majesty's Revenue, and the more effectual preventing the running of Goods.	The whole act.
11 Geo. 2. c. 6	Administration of Justice (Language) Act (Ireland) 1737	An Act that all Proceedings in Courts of Justice within this Kingdom shall be in the English Language.	Sections Three, Four, Seven, and Eight.
11 Geo. 2. c. 10	N/A	An Act for allowing further Time to Persons in Offices to qualify themselves pursuant to an Act, intituled "An Act to prevent the further Growth of Popery"; and for giving further Ease to Protestant Dissenters with respect to Matrimonial Contracts.	The whole act.
11 Geo. 2. c. 11	N/A	An Act the title of which begins with the words,—An Act for the buying and selling of all Sorts of Corn,—and ends with the words,—Markets.	The whole act.
11 Geo. 2. c. 12	Game Act 1737	An Act for the better Preservation of the Game.	The whole act.
11 Geo. 2. c. 13	N/A	An Act for reviving, continuing, and explaining, and amending several temporary Statutes, and for other Purposes therein mentioned.	The whole act.
11 Geo. 2. c. 14	N/A	An Act for the further Improvement and Encouragement of the Fishery of this Kingdom.	The whole act.
11 Geo. 2. c. 16	Insolvent Debtors Relief Act 1737	An Act for the Relief of Insolvent Debtors.	The whole act.
11 Geo. 2. c. 19	N/A	An Act for the further explaining and amending the several Acts of Parliament now in Force for erecting Lamps in the City of Dublin and Liberties thereof.	The whole act.
13 Geo. 2. c. 1	N/A	An Act for granting and continuing to His Majesty an additional Duty on Beer, Ale, Strong Waters, Wine, Tobacco, and other Goods and Merchandizes therein mentioned.	The whole act.
13 Geo. 2. c. 2	N/A	An Act the title of which begins with the words,—An Act for granting to His Majesty a further additional Duty on Wine,—and ends with the words,—Principal Sum.	The whole act.
13 Geo. 2. c. 3	N/A	An Act for continuing and amending several Laws heretofore made relating to His Majesty's Revenue, and the more effectual preventing of Frauds in His Majesty's Customs and Excise.	The whole act.
13 Geo. 2. c. 4	N/A	An Act for continuing several temporary Statutes.	The whole act.
13 Geo. 2. c. 5	N/A	An Act to continue and amend an Act made in the Ninth Year of the Reign of His present Majesty, intituled "An Act for the better regulating of Juries."	The whole act.
13 Geo. 2. c. 6	N/A	An Act to explain, amend, and make more effectual an Act passed in the Seventh Year of the Reign of His late Majesty King William the Third of Glorious Memory, intituled "An Act for the better securing the Government by disarming Papists."	The whole act.
13 Geo. 2. c. 7	N/A	An Act for allowing further Time to Persons in Offices or Employments to qualify themselves pursuant to an Act, intituled "An Act to prevent the further Growth of Popery."	The whole act.
13 Geo. 2. c. 8	N/A	An Act for the more effectual preventing of excessive and deceitful Gaming.	Sections One and Three, so far as they relate to the appropriation of penalties. Section Four, from "in which action" to end of that section. Section Nine, from "one moiety" to "same use," and from "in which action," to "allowed". Sections Twelve and Thirteen.
13 Geo. 2. c. 9	N/A	An Act the title of which begins with the words,—An Act for explaining and amending an Act for the relief of Mortgagees,—and ends with the words,—younger children.	Sections One and Four.
13 Geo. 2. c. 12	N/A	An Act for continuing and amending the Laws now in force in relation to Butter and Tallow, and the Casks in which such Goods are to be made up, and for the Curing of Hides and making up Beef and Pork for Exportation; and for preventing the Destruction of Salmon.	Except Section Six.
15 Geo. 2. c. 1	N/A	An Act for granting and continuing to His Majesty an additional Duty on Beer, Ale, Strong Waters, Wine, Tobacco, and other Goods and Merchandizes therein mentioned.	The whole act.
15 Geo. 2. c. 2	N/A	An Act the title of which begins with the words,—An Act for granting to His Majesty a further additional Duty on Wine,—and ends with the words,—Principal Sum.	The whole act.
15 Geo. 2. c. 3	N/A	An Act for continuing and amending several Laws heretofore made relating to His Majesty's Revenue, and for the more effectual preventing frauds in His Majesty's Customs and Excise.	The whole act.
15 Geo. 2. c. 6	n/a	An Act for continuing and amending several Statutes now near expiring, and for other purposes therein mentioned.	The whole act.
15 Geo. 2. c. 8	Distress for Rent Act 1741	An Act for the more effectual securing the Payment of Rents, and preventing Frauds by Tenants.	Section Three, from "wherein" to end of that section. Section Eleven.
15 Geo. 2. c. 11	N/A	An Act the title of which begins with the words,—An Act to revive and amend an Act made in the Sixth Year of His late Majesty King George the First, intituled "An Act for erecting and continuing Lights in the City of Dublin,"—and ends with the words,—Liberties thereof.	The whole act.
17 Geo. 2. c. 1	N/A	An Act for granting and continuing to His Majesty an additional Duty on Beer, Ale, Strong Waters, Wine, Tobacco, Hides, and other Goods and Merchandizes herein mentioned.	The whole act.
17 Geo. 2. c. 2	N/A	An Act the title of which begins with the words,—An Act for granting to His Majesty a further additional Duty on Wine,—and ends with the words,—Principal Sums.	The whole act.
17 Geo. 2. c. 4	Transportation Act 1743	An Act for the more effectual Transportation of Felons and Vagabonds.	Section Two.
17 Geo. 2. c. 5	Slaughter of Cattle Act 1743	An Act to amend and make more effectual the Laws to prevent the Maiming, Killing, and Destroying of Cattle, and to prevent Frauds committed by Butchers denying Meat for Sale.	Sections Two and Three. Section Four, so far as it relates to Seneschals, and the appropriation of penalties.
17 Geo. 2. c. 6	N/A	An Act the title of which begins with the words,—An Act to take away the Benefit of Clergy,—and ends with the words,—other Robbers.	The whole act.
17 Geo. 2. c. 8	Truck Act 1743	An Act for continuing several Statutes now near expiring, and for amending other Statutes, and for other Purposes therein mentioned.	Sections Two, Four, and Five. Section Six, the words "to be paid to the informer, and."
17 Geo. 2. c. 9	N/A	An Act for allowing further Time to Persons in Offices or Employments to qualify themselves pursuant to an Act, intituled "An Act to prevent the further Growth of Popery."	The whole act.
17 Geo. 2. c. 10	Burning of Land Act 1743	An Act to prevent the pernicious Practice of burning Land, and for the more effectual destroying of Vermin.	Sections Eight and Nine.
17 Geo. 2. c. 12	Quarantine Act 1743	An Act to oblige Ships coming from Places infected more effectually to perform their Quarantine, and for the better preventing the Plague being brought from Foreign parts into Ireland, and to hinder the spreading of Infection.	The whole act.
19 Geo. 2. c. 1	N/A	An Act the title of which begins with the words,—An Act to make it High Treason to hold Correspondence with the Sons of the Pretender,—and ends with the words,—this Kingdom.	The whole act.
19 Geo. 2. c. 2	N/A	An Act the title of which begins with the words,—An Act for granting and continuing to his Majesty an additional Duty on Beer,—and ends with the words,—Great Britain.	The whole act.
19 Geo. 2. c. 3	N/A	An Act the title of which begins with the words,—An Act for granting to His Majesty an additional Duty on Wine,—and ends with the words,—Principal Sums.	The whole act.
19 Geo. 2. c. 4	N/A	An Act for continuing and amending several Laws heretofore made relating to His Majesty's Revenue, and for the more effectual preventing of Frauds in His Majesty's Customs and Excise.	The whole act.
19 Geo. 2. c. 5	N/A	An Act for Licensing Hawkers and Pedlars; and for the Encouragement of English Protestant Schools.	The whole act.
19 Geo. 2. c. 6	N/A	An Act for repealing the several Acts of Parliament made in this Kingdom for the Encouragement and Improvement of the Hempen and Flaxen Manufactures; and for the better regulating, improving, and encouraging the said Manufactures.	Section One.
19 Geo. 2. c. 7	N/A	An Act for the more effectual preventing His Majesty's Subjects from entering into Foreign Service; and for publishing an Act of the seventh year of King William the Third, intituled "An Act to prevent Foreign Education."	Section Six.
19 Geo. 2. c. 8	N/A	An Act for allowing further Time to Persons in Offices or Employments to qualify themselves pursuant to an Act, intituled "An Act to prevent the further Growth of Popery."	The whole act.
19 Geo. 2. c. 9	N/A	An Act to continue and amend an Act passed in the Second Year of the Reign of His late Majesty King George the First, intituled "An Act to make the Militia of this Kingdom more useful."	The whole act.
19 Geo. 2. c. 10	Juries Act 1745	An Act for continuing and amending the several Acts for the better regulating of Juries.	The whole act.
19 Geo. 2. c. 12	Municipal Corporations Act 1745	An Act for the better regulating of Corporations.	Section Fourteen.
19 Geo. 2. c. 13	Abductions Act 1745	An Act the title of which begins with the words,—An Act for annulling all Marriages to be celebrated by any Popish Priest,—and ends with the words,—Parents or Guardians.	Section One.
19 Geo. 2. c. 14	N/A	An Act for explaining an Act passed in the Seventh Year of His late Majesty King William the Third, intituled "An Act for the Preservation of the Game, and the more easy Conviction of such as shall destroy the same."	The whole act.
19 Geo. 2. c. 15	N/A	An Act for reviving and continuing several temporary Statutes.	The whole act.
19 Geo. 2. c. 17	N/A	An Act the title of which begins with the words,—An Act for continuing and amending an Act, intituled "An Act for the buying and selling of all sorts of Corn,"—and ends with the word,—Markets.	The whole act.
21 Geo. 2. c. 1	N/A	An Act the title of which begins with the words,—An Act for granting and continuing to His Majesty an additional Duty on Beer,—and ends with the words,—Great Britain.	The whole act.
21 Geo. 2. c. 2	N/A	An Act the title of which begins with the words,—An Act for granting to His Majesty an additional Duty on Wine,—and ends with the words,—Principal Sum.	The whole act.
21 Geo. 2. c. 3	N/A	An Act for Licensing Hawkers and Pedlars; and for the Encouragement of English Protestant Schools.	The whole act.
21 Geo. 2. c. 4	N/A	An Act for continuing and amending several Laws heretofore made relating to His Majesty's Revenue, and for the more effectual preventing of Frauds in His Majesty's Customs and Excise.	The whole act.
21 Geo. 2. c. 5	N/A	An Act for allowing further Time to Persons in Offices or Employments to qualify themselves pursuant to an Act, intituled "An Act to prevent the further Growth of Popery."	The whole act.
21 Geo. 2. c. 6	Juries Act 1747	An Act for amending the several Acts for the better regulating of Juries.	The whole act.
21 Geo. 2. c. 7	N/A	An Act for reviving, continuing, and amending several temporary Statutes.	The whole act.
21 Geo. 2. c. 8	N/A	An Act the title of which begins with the words,—An Act for disappropriating Benefices,—and ends with the words,—Cathedral Churches.	The whole act.
21 Geo. 2. c. 9	N/A	An Act the title of which begins with the words,—An Act to amend and make more effectual an Act passed in the Fourth Year of the Reign of His late Majesty King George the First, intituled "An Act for vesting in His Majesty,"—and ends with the words,—Soldiers in their March.	The whole act.
21 Geo. 2. c. 10	Newtown Act 1747	An Act the title of which begins with the words,—An Act to amend and make more effectual an Act, intituled "An Act for better regulating Elections,"—and ends with the words,—this Kingdom.	Section Nine.
21 Geo. 2. c. 11	N/A	An Act for amending the Laws in relation to Fines and Common Recoveries; and for better securing the Rights of Purchasers under Sales made in pursuance of Decrees in the several Courts of Equity in this Kingdom.	The whole act.

== See also ==
- Statute Law Revision Act
