= List of acts of the Parliament of Ireland =

This is a list of acts of the Parliament of Ireland, which was in existence from the 13th century until 1800.

- List of acts of the Parliament of Ireland, 1169–1192
- List of acts of the Parliament of Ireland, 1200–1299
- List of acts of the Parliament of Ireland, 1300–1399
- List of acts of the Parliament of Ireland, 1400–1499
- List of acts of the Parliament of Ireland, 1500–1599
- List of acts of the Parliament of Ireland, 1600–1690
- List of acts of the Parliament of Ireland, 1691–1700

- List of acts of the Parliament of Ireland, 1701–1710
- List of acts of the Parliament of Ireland, 1711–1720
- List of acts of the Parliament of Ireland, 1721–1730
- List of acts of the Parliament of Ireland, 1731–1740
- List of acts of the Parliament of Ireland, 1741–1750
- List of acts of the Parliament of Ireland, 1751–1760
- List of acts of the Parliament of Ireland, 1761–1770
- List of acts of the Parliament of Ireland, 1771–1780
- List of acts of the Parliament of Ireland, 1781–1790
- List of acts of the Parliament of Ireland, 1791–1800

== See also ==
For acts passed in England and Great Britain, some of which applied to Ireland, see the list of acts of the Parliament of England and the list of acts of the Parliament of Great Britain.

For acts passed from 1801 onwards, see the list of acts of the Parliament of the United Kingdom.

See also the list of acts of the Parliament of Scotland.
