= List of acts of the Parliament of Ireland, 1300–1399 =

This is a list of acts of the Parliament of Ireland for the years from 1300 to 1399.

The number shown by each act's title is its chapter number. Acts are cited using this number, preceded by the years of the reign during which the relevant parliamentary session was held; thus the act concerning assay passed in 1783 is cited as "23 & 24 Geo. 3 c. 23", meaning the 23rd act passed during the session that started in the 23rd year of the reign of George III and which finished in the 24th year of that reign. Note that the modern convention is to use Arabic numerals in citations (thus "40 Geo. 3" rather than "40 Geo. III"). Acts of the reign of Elizabeth I are formally cited without a regnal numeral in the Republic of Ireland.

Acts passed by the Parliament of Ireland did not have a short title; however, some of these acts have subsequently been given a short title by acts of the Parliament of the United Kingdom, acts of the Parliament of Northern Ireland, or acts of the Oireachtas. This means that some acts have different short titles in the Republic of Ireland and Northern Ireland respectively. Official short titles are indicated by the flags of the respective jurisdictions.

A number of the acts included in this list are still in force in Northern Ireland or the Republic of Ireland. Because these two jurisdictions are entirely separate, the version of an act in force in one may differ from the version in force in the other; similarly, an act may have been repealed in one but not in the other.

A number of acts passed by the Parliament of England also extended to Ireland during this period.

== 1 Edw. 2 (1307) ==
- Observance in Ireland of Statute of Winchester
- Writ transmitting an ordinance concerning the military order of the Temple in Ireland, their lands, etc.
- Wine traders

== 2 Edw. 2 (1308) ==
- Tolls by Geffrey de Morton.

== 3 Edw. 2 (1310) ==
- c. 1 An Act to restrain great Lords from taking of Prises, Lodging, and Sojourning, against the Will of the Owner. — repealed by Criminal Statutes (Ireland) Repeal Act 1828 (9 Geo. 4. c. 53)
- c. 2 An Act against the keeping of idle men and Kernes in time of peace. — repealed by Statute Law Revision (Ireland) Act 1878 (41 & 42 Vict. c. 57)
- c. 3 An Act against giving Protections. — repealed by Statute Law Revision (Ireland) Act 1878 (41 & 42 Vict. c. 57)
- c. 4 An Act against fraudulent conveyances. — repealed by Statute Law Revision (Ireland) Act 1878 (41 & 42 Vict. c. 57)
- c. 5 An Act that Justices of Assise shal deliver estreates into the Exchequer. — repealed by Statute Law Revision (Ireland) Act 1878 (41 & 42 Vict. c. 57)
- c. 6 Device to circumvent doctrine of escheat.
- c. 7 No one to supply victuals or aid to any in rebellion.
- c. 8 None shall give protections but the King.
- c. 9 Those who have lands in the marches (border with native Irish) to guard them.
- c. 10 Only those of the English nation to be received into religious orders.
- c. 11 Certain ordinances to be published; offenders to be excommunicated.
- Statute of Kilkenny Sheriffs to summon representatives etc.

== 5 Edw. 2 (1312) ==
- Bristol traders in Ireland
- Dublin murage

== 8 Edw. 2 (1315) ==
- Purveyance for Earl of Lancaster

== Edw. 2 (Uncertain date circa 1315) ==
- Wine traders

== 10 Edw. 2 (1316) ==
- Rents of alien absentees' lands to be expended for defence of the country
- Drogheda towards Uriell

== 11 Edw. 2 (1317) ==
- Defences of Dublin City against Scots

== 12 Edw. 2 (1318) ==
- Drogheda murage
- Defences of Dublin City against Scots

== 13 Edw. 2 (1319) ==
- Repair of the belfry of the church of St. Mary del Dam

== 13 Edw. 2 (1320) ==
- Confirmation of observance in Ireland of Statutes of Merton, Marlborough, Westminster the First, Westminster the Second, Gloucester
- c. 1 Liberties, customs, franchises, etc., of the Holy Church to be enjoyed without interference.
- c. 2
- c. 3 Against those who commit waste.
- c. 4 None to grant protection, save the King and lords of liberties.
- c. 5 A justice, with two knights, in each county, to hold assizes, gaol delivery, etc.
- c. 6 Chief Justiciar in his journeys to enquire as to the officers of the Exchequer and the justices of the Bench.
- c. 7 Alienations made with a view to going to war.
- c. 8 Time for pleas in the Exchequer.
- c. 9 One measure and one weight to be used in Ireland.
- c. 10 No one to be mainprised (form of custody) unless mainpernable by law.
- c. 11 Seneschals of liberties to aid in capturing felons in the Crosses.
- c. 12 Seneschals of one liberty to aid in case of felons in another liberty.
- c. 13 Certain ordinances to be published; offenders to be excommunicated.
- Petition by John de Tuyt for pardon of arrears, which was granted by the King, who ordered the Exchequer to acquit him of half.

== 13 Edw. 2 (1321) ==
- Use in Ireland of the English law concerning life and limbs.

== 17 Edw. 2 (1324) ==
- Observance in Ireland of Statute of Lincoln
- Observance in Ireland of Statute of York
- c. 1 Justiciar and officers in Ireland not to purchase land within their jurisdictions.
- c. 2 Certain officers not to take victuals against the will of any, except of necessity.
- c. 3 Certain officers not to impound certain ships or goods of strangers, etc.
- c. 4 Fee for seal, etc., on bills of grace.
- c. 5 Fee of Marshal of a prison.
- c. 6 Pardon for homicide or felony not to be made without the King's special mandate.
- c. 7 Sealing original writs.
- c. 8 Circumstances where adjournment of assize of Novel Disseisin is permissible.
- Publication in the land of Ireland of the articles contained in ordinance
- Common law, ordinances of Dublin and usages of the land to be maintained

== 19 Edw. 2 (1325) ==
- Statute of Ireland

== 19 Edw. 2 (1326) ==
- c. 1 Staple for Ireland to be held in Dublin, Drogheda and Cork.
- c. 2 No alien may purchase elsewhere on penalty.
- c. 3 Sales to aliens only at the staples.
- c. 4 Merchants not to conspire to lessen price of wool, etc., penalty.
- c. 5 Merchants to be governed by the law merchant.
- c. 6 Citizens and commonalty to use only cloth made in England, Ireland or Wales.
- c. 7 Cloth may be made long or short.
- c. 8 To encourage cloth working, franchises to be granted to fullers, spinners, etc.
- c. 9 Wool merchants to have a mayor of the staple.
- c. 10 Merchant strangers taken under the King's protection.
- An aid of forces granted for suppressing felons and rebels in Tipperary.

== 5 Edw. 3 (1331) ==
- c. 1 Limit of charters of pardon, etc.
- c. 2 No protection to felons in woods.
- c. 3 Same law for Irish as English, save service of betaghs and villeins (labourers tied to the land).
- c. 4 The King's wardships and marriages to be sold for his profit.
- c. 5 Sheriffs and coroners to be elected by communities of the counties.
- c. 6 No magnate in mainprise towards the King.
- c. 7 Hostages for peace to be kept in King's castles, etc.
- c. 8 No protection to any being against the King's peace.
- c. 9 No officer of the King to be pledged towards him.
- c. 10 Money to be taken in fine.
- c. 11 Truce between English and Irish to be observed.
- c. 12 No outlaw in geldable land (land liable to taxation) to be received in Liberties, etc.
- c. 13 Sheriffs, etc., to account once a year.
- c. 14 A lord's seneschal not to be an officer of the King.
- c. 15 King's castles to be inspected yearly by the Treasurer.
- c. 16 Sheriffs to put their names in returns to writs.
- c. 17 Burgesses to collect customs in towns.
- c. 18 Justiciar to enquire yearly as to the King's officers, etc.
- c. 19 No person to maintain kernes (foot-soldiers) or idlemen, except in their own marches (boundaries of land).
- c. 20 King's officers to find mainprize (surety) in Ireland to answer for their account there.
- c. 21 All having lands in Ireland to reside in same or place guard in them.
- c. 22 None to favour the Irish who are against the King's peace.
- Castles, lands, etc., granted after the King undertook the government to be resumed into his hands.
- Statute on Wardship English law of wardship.

== 6 Edw. 3 (1332) ==
- Observance in Ireland of several statutes.

== 16 Edw. 3 (1342) ==
- c. 1 Reasons for want of profit from the King's lands.
- c. 2 Officers not executing the law by force of arms.
- c. 3 Corruption by King's Officers who ride in force so as to claim fees.
- c. 4 Castles, etc., in the enemy's hands by default of the King's officers.
- c. 5 Prohibition of fees paid for castles that no longer exist.
- c. 6 Payment for victuals taken.
- c. 7 Officers appointed, not sufficient to answer to the King.
- c. 8 Costs of maintaining leased lands, etc., not allowed.
- c. 9 Officers holding several offices.
- c. 10 English lieges in Ireland ousted from their freeholds.
- c. 11 Fee-farm lands retaken into the King's hands.
- c. 12 The King's officers seize goods, etc., of a crown debtor.
- c. 13 Officers not delivering back lands, etc., seized.
- c. 14 Escheators' fees on unjust seizures.
- c. 15 Persons have to answer in England for felonies in Ireland.
- c. 16 Partial truces or peaces.
- c. 17 Lands occupied by the Irish enemy during truces held by them thereafter.
- c. 18 Proper maintenance of lands, etc.
- c. 19 Warrants to distrain where terms for payment of debts granted.
- c. 20 Abuses in election of sheriffs, etc.
- c. 21 Fees to marshal by those arrested.
- c. 22 Writs through malice, etc.
- c. 23 King's officers take victuals, etc., without payment.
- c. 24 Royal service compounded for in money (restriction in certain cases of feudal service attaching to land, etc.).
- c. 25 Dwellers in marches (border areas with Irish enemy) be amerced (punished or fined) reasonably.
- c. 26 Imprisonment without indictment and seizure of goods.
- c. 27 Appointment of certain officials for ports, etc., as in England.
- Observance in Ireland of 15 Edw. 3 St. 2.

== 16 & 17 Edw. 3 (1342-43) ==
- King transmitted to his Treasurer and Barons a transcript of an ancient statute used in the Exchequer of England, as to the levying of Queen's gold, commanding its enrolment and observance in Ireland.

== 18 Edw. 3 (1344) ==
- None to supply the Irish at war against the King.

== 23 Edw. 3 (1349) ==
- Servants and labourers.

== 24 Edw. 3 (1349-50) ==
- Magnates in England having lands in Ireland, to have there men at arms.

== 25 Edw. 3 (1351) ==
- c. 1 Liberties, customs, franchises, etc., of the Holy Church to be enjoyed without interference: Great Charter confirmed.
- c. 2 No one to keep kernes (foot-soldiers), etc., except in the marches (boundary with the native Irish) and then only at his own cost.
- c. 3 Idlemen to have lands to farm.
- c. 4 As to parley, etc., between marchers (those living on the boundary with native Irish) and the enemy.
- c. 5 Chieftains to punish their own retainers, etc.
- c. 6 One peace and one war throughout Ireland.
- c. 7 Officers of franchises may pursue felons into geldable land and sheriffs may pursue into franchises.
- c. 8 Fraudulent feoffments (granting of lands) void.
- c. 9 Wardens of the peace in each county.
- c. 10 Fee of Marshals of the Benches.
- c. 11 No alliance between English and the English or Irish enemies.
- c. 12 Receivers of felons to be imprisoned.
- c. 13 English truce-breakers to be imprisoned.
- c. 14 Statute of labourers to be sent to every sheriff, mayor, etc., for proclamation.
- c. 15 English not to stir up war.
- c. 16 Common law to be used by English, and not the Brehon law, or the march law.
- c. 17 The King's officers not be hindered.
- c. 18 Persons having lands in the march lands (border lands) to maintain and aid the marches, etc.
- c. 19 Residents in England having lands in Ireland to contribute towards their defence.
- c. 20 Robbers, malefactors, etc., not to be maintained.
- c. 21 Serjeants of fee to make due execution.
- c. 22 Sheriffs to seize goods forfeited by attainder, etc.
- c. 23 As to taking sheriffs' accounts, Leinster counties.
- c. 24 Fees of sheriffs in their turns.
- c. 25 No pleas of withernam before sheriffs.
- Statute on Weights and Measures Weights and measures.
- Observance of 25 Edw. 3 st. 5.

== 29 Edw. 3 (1355) ==
- Forestallers of Fish
- Correction of errors in Parliaments to be held in Ireland.

== 31 Edw. 3 (1357) ==
- State of the Land of Ireland

== 34 Edw. 3 (1360) ==
- Writ, against people associating with the Irish, using their language, or sending children to be nursed among them.

== 35 Edw. 3 (1360) ==
- Prohibition on native Irish being made mayor, bailiff, etc.
- c. 1 Profits of the King's lands.
- c. 2 Sheriffs to be elected by each county, etc.
- c. 3 Sheriffs to act as escheators.
- c. 4 As to letting of lands in the King's hands.
- c. 5 Appointment of seneschals, etc., of King's lands.
- c. 6 Accounts of levying the King's debts to be rendered at the Exchequer.
- c. 7 Holders of great serjeanties to attend on sheriffs' accounts.

== 36 Edw. 3 (1363) ==
- Observance of 36 Edw. 3 st. 1 and st. 2.

== 37 Edw. 3 (1363) ==
- Observance of 36 Edw. 3 st. 1 and st. 2.

== 40 Edw. 3 (1366) ==
- Statute of Kilkenny

== 42 Edw. 3 (1368) ==
- An ordinance made concerning the land of Ireland.

== 1 Ric. 2 (1377) ==
This session was also traditionally cited as 1 R. 2.

- Murgh Obryen subsidised, on condition of withdrawing from Leinster.

== 1 Ric. 2 (1378) ==
- Ordinances as to a special guard being assigned for Carlow and neighbourhood during the parliament; as to the Justiciary's fees and allowances, etc., he to have a special guard.

== 3 Ric. 2 (1380) ==
This session was also traditionally cited as 3 R. 2.

- Petitions on behalf of Ireland delivered in the present parliament, together with the answers there made to the same.

== 4 Ric. 2 (1380) ==
This session was also traditionally cited as 4 R. 2.

- Small new customs to be levied.
- Subsidy granted by prelates and clergy.
- Statute 40 Edw. 3 c. 14 confirmed.

== 9 Ric. 2 (1385) ==
This session was also traditionally cited as 9 R. 2.

- Community of the land of Ireland, as to not being molested against liberty.
- Presence of the King.
- Writ conveying terms of three English statutes: 27 Edw. 3, 31 Edw. 3, 4 Ric. 2.

== 12 Ric. 2 (1388) ==
This session was also traditionally cited as 12 R. 2.

- Recitals granting subsidies and armed men in aid of the wars.
- Corporation of Dublin.

== 13 Ric. 2 (1389) ==
This session was also traditionally cited as 13 R. 2.

- Prohibition of sale of falcons, hawks, etc.

== 13 Ric. 2 (1390) ==
- Proceedings in Parliament, referring to the release of Nelan O'Neel, on his giving hostages.

== 15 Ric. 2 (1391) ==
This session was also traditionally cited as 15 R. 2.

- Observance in Ireland of Statutes of England.

== 17 Ric. 2 (1393) ==
This session was also traditionally cited as 17 R. 2.

- Observance of ordinance for Ireland, 1357.

== 18 Ric. 2 (1394) ==
This session was also traditionally cited as 18 R. 2.

- None to sell necessaries to any Irishman not abiding among English lieges.

== 1 Hen. 4 (1399) ==
This session was also traditionally cited as 1 H. 4.

- Statute of Absentees

== See also ==
- List of acts of the Parliament of Ireland
- List of acts of the Oireachtas
- List of legislation in the United Kingdom
