= Sunday Observance Act 1695 =

Act of the Parliament of Ireland

Sunday Observance Act 1695 (Note: Short title given by Short Titles Act 1962 (No. 5))
- Act of Parliament
- Parliament of Ireland
- Long title: An Act for the better Observation of the Lord's-Day, commonly called Sunday.
- Citation: 7 Will 3. c. 17 (I)
- Introduced by: Irish Privy Council
- Territorial extent: Republic of Ireland; Northern Ireland

Dates
- Royal assent: 7 December 1695
- Commencement: 1 November 1695 (Note: Section 11.)
- Repealed: Republic of Ireland: 22 July 1997

Other legislation
- Amended by: Statute Law Revision (Ireland) Act 1878; Statute Law Revision (Ireland) Act 1879
- Repealed by: Republic of Ireland: Criminal Law Act 1997

Status
- Republic of Ireland: Repealed
- Northern Ireland: Amended

Text of statute as originally enacted

An Act for the better Observation of the Lord's-Day, commonly called Sunday (7 Will 3. c. 17 (I); short title Sunday Observance Act (Ireland) 1695 in Northern Ireland, Sunday Observance Act 1695 in Republic of Ireland) is a 1695 act of the Parliament of Ireland, which provided for the prohibition on Sundays in the Kingdom of Ireland of certain work and leisure activities, to promote Sabbatarianism and observance of Sunday as the Christian sabbath. As of 19 April 2018 sections of the act remain in force in Northern Ireland.

== Provisions ==
The act resembled the Sunday Observance Act 1677 passed by the Parliament of England. The Irish act affirmed that people should be attending church and not working on Sundays except for necessary or emergency works. The fine for violating was 5 shillings. The act granted an exemption to public houses and inns and to hackney carriages in Dublin between the hours of 10am and 4pm. It also had the effect of specifically banning sports being played on Sunday in Ireland on the grounds that they led to "tumultuous and disorderly meetings" which interfered with observance of the Sabbath. In law, it prohibited the publication or execution of writs, judgments or warrants on Sundays and held that the "hundreds" (i.e. baronies) were not responsible for any robberies that occurred on Sunday unless the hue and cry was raised.

== Later history ==
The act meant that those ordinarily in fear of being sent to debtors' prison could emerge from hiding on Sundays; one case hinged on whether the clock had struck midnight before the debtor's arrest. In the nineteenth century, Sabbatarians advocated use of the act to prevent playing of sports on Sundays, which was common in rural areas. From 1872, Royal Irish Constabulary policy was to permit Sunday sports events unless they were likely to lead to a breach of the peace.

The Statute Law Revision (Ireland) Act 1878 repealed sections 6 and 11, and section 9 "so far as it relates to the appropriation of penalties". The Statute Law Revision (Ireland) Act 1879 repealed section 5 and part of section 3 so far as it relates to the appropriation of penalties. Some acts of the Parliament of Northern Ireland and associated secondary legislation allow the effecting of legal documents "notwithstanding anything in section 7 of the Sunday Observance Act (Ireland) 1695".

In the Republic of Ireland, the act was invoked in 1951 to strike out a drunk driving charge where the Peace Commissioner's remand order was made on a Sunday, whereas in 1964 a summons issued on a Sunday was ruled valid despite the 1695 act. The act was repealed in the Republic by the Criminal Law Act 1997.

In the 1990s the act remained in force and was utilised by Northern Ireland district councils as grounds to close parks and leisure centres on Sundays. An adjournment debate in the House of Commons of the United Kingdom led by the Social Democratic and Labour Party's Seamus Mallon in 1995 criticised the act and requested it be repealed. The Northern Ireland Office minister Malcolm Moss stated that they would look into amending some of the provisions of the act; his legal advice was that leisure centres open on Sunday "could technically be in breach" of the act but that "the chances of a successful prosecution ... are considered remote".

Section 7 has been affirmed as valid by the Police Service of Northern Ireland's Human Rights legal advisor and still remains in force in Northern Ireland which prevents the PSNI issuing warrants on Sunday.

== See also ==
- Sunday football in Northern Ireland
- Lord's Day Observance Society

== Bibliography ==
- "7 William III c.xvii : An Act for the Better Observation of the Lord's-Day, commonly called Sunday". Statutes Passed in the Parliaments Held in Ireland. Vol. II: 1665–1712. Dublin: George Grierson. 1794. pp. 270–273.
- "Bill Number 3665: For the better observation of the Lord's Day, commonly called Sunday". Irish Legislation Database. Queen's University Belfast. Archived from the original on 25 February 2015.
- "Sunday Observance (Northern Ireland)". Hansard. 28 June 1995. vol 262 cc865-71.
