= Statutes of Kilkenny =

Language laws in medieval Ireland

- Parliament of Ireland
- Long title: A Statute of the Fortieth Year of King Edward III., enacted in a parliament held in Kilkenny, A.D. 1367, before Lionel Duke of Clarence, Lord Lieutenant of Ireland.
- Citation: 40 Edw. 3 (I)
- Introduced by: The Duke of Clarence (Lords)
- Territorial extent: Ireland

Dates
- Royal assent: 1366
- Commencement: 1366
- Repealed: 16 May 1983
Other legislation
Repealed by	Statute Law Revision Act 1983

Status: Repealed

Text of statute as originally enacted

The Statutes of Kilkenny (40 Edw. 3 (I)) were a series of thirty-five acts enacted by the Parliament of Ireland at Kilkenny in 1366, aiming to curb the decline of the Hiberno-Norman Lordship of Ireland. The statutes generally prohibited English and Anglo-Normans from cohabiting with the native Irish.

== Background to the statutes ==
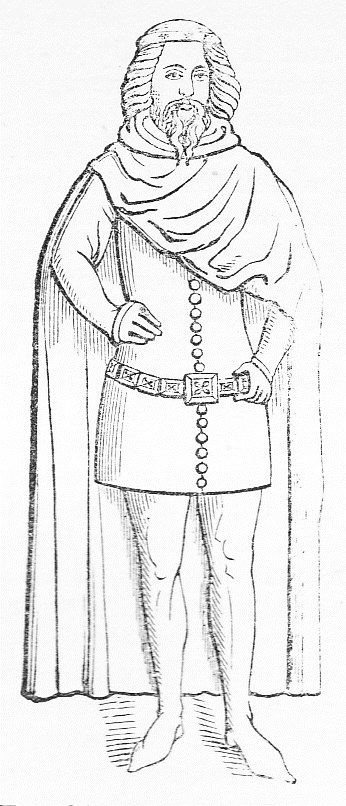
Lionel of Antwerp, 1st Duke of Clarence (1338–68), principal author of the Statutes of Kilkenny

By the middle decades of the 14th century, the Hiberno-Norman presence in Ireland was perceived to be under threat, mostly due to the dissolution of English laws and customs among English settlers. These English settlers were described as "more Irish than the Irish themselves", referring to their taking up Irish law, custom, costume and language. The introduction to the text of the statutes claim,

Original Anglo-Norman: ... ore plusors Engleis de la dit terre guepissant la lang gis monture leys & usages Engleis vivent et se governement as maniers guise et lang des Irrois enemies et auxiant ount fait divers mariages & aliaunces enter eux et les Irrois enemyes avauntditz dont le dit terre et le lieg people de icelle la lang Engloies ligeance a nostre seignour le Roy Duc et lez leis Engleis illoeques sont mis en subjection et retrets...

... now many English of the said land, forsaking the English language, manners, mode of riding, laws and usages, live and govern themselves according to the manners, fashion, and language of the Irish enemies; and also have made divers marriages and alliances between themselves and the Irish enemies aforesaid; whereby the said land, and the liege people thereof, the English language, the allegiance due to our lord the king, and the English laws there, are put in subjection and decayed...

The statutes tried to prevent this "middle nation", which was neither true English nor Irish, by reasserting English culture among the English settlers.

There were also military threats to the Norman presence, such as the failed invasion by Robert Bruce's brother Edward Bruce in 1315, which was defended by the Irish chief Domhnall Ó Néill in his Remonstrance to Pope John XXII, complaining that "For the English inhabiting our land ... are so different in character from the English of England ... that with the greatest propriety they may be called a nation not of middle medium, but of utmost, perfidy". Further, there was the de Burgh or Burke Civil War of 1333–38, which led to the disintegration of the estate of the Earldom of Ulster into three separate lordships, two of which were in outright rebellion against the crown.

The prime author of the statutes was Lionel of Antwerp, better known as the Duke of Clarence, and who was also the Earl of Ulster. In 1361, he had been sent as viceroy to Ireland by Edward III to recover his own lands in Ulster if possible and to turn back the advancing tide of the Irish. The statutes were enacted by a parliament that he summoned in 1366. The following year, he left Ireland.

Many of the "statutes" (or "chapters") of the 1366 parliament repeated "ordinances" made by a great council held in 1351, also in Kilkenny.

== Legislation ==
The statutes begin by recognising that the English settlers had been influenced by Irish culture and customs, as quoted above. They forbade the intermarriage between the native Irish and the native English, the English fostering of Irish children, the English adoption of Irish children and use of Irish names and dress. Those English colonists who did not know how to speak English were required to learn the language (on pain of losing their land and belongings), along with many other English customs. The Irish pastimes of "horlings" and "coiting" were to be dropped and pursuits such as archery and lancing to be taken up, so that the English colonists would be more able to defend against Irish aggression, using English military tactics.

Other statutes required that the English in Ireland be governed by English common law, instead of the Irish March law or Brehon law and ensured the separation of the Irish and English churches by requiring that "no Irishman of the nations of the Irish be admitted into any cathedral or collegiate church ... amongst the English of the land".

The mistrust the English had of the Irish is demonstrated by Statute XV, which forbade Irish minstrels or storytellers to come to English areas, guarding against "the Irish agents who come amongst the English, spy out the secrets, plans, and policies of the English, whereby great evils have often resulted".

== Failure of the statutes ==
While the statutes were sweeping in scope and aim, the English never had the resources to fully implement them. Clarence was forced to leave Ireland the following year (and died the year after that), and Hiberno-Norman Ireland continued to gain a primarily Irish cultural identity. Only at the beginning of the 17th century would another attempt to colonise Ireland begin to make appreciable gains. The Statutes of Kilkenny ultimately helped to create the complete estrangement of the two "races" in Ireland for almost three centuries.

== See also ==
- Norman Ireland
- Tudor conquest of Ireland
- Poynings' Law (disambiguation)

== Bibliography ==
Primary

- The statute of Kilkenny preceded by the ordinances of 1351, edited and translated by Keith Busby, Dublin : Irish Manuscripts Commission, 2025, ISBN 978-1-906865-99-3
- Berry, Henry Fitz-Patrick, ed. (1907). "XL Edward III". Statutes and ordinances, and acts of the Parliament of Ireland. King John to Henry V. Statute rolls of the Parliament of Ireland (in French and English). Vol. 1. Dublin: Alexander Thom for HMSO. pp. 430–469.
- Ó Néill, Domhnall (1317), Curtis, Edmond (ed.), Remonstrance of the Irish Chiefs to Pope John XXII

Secondary

- Dolan, Terence (1999). "Writing in Ireland". In Wallace, David (ed.). The Cambridge history of medieval English literature (1st ed.). Cambridge University Press. ISBN 9780521444200.
- Fry, Plantagenet Somerset; Fry, Fiona Somerset (1991), A History of Ireland, Routledge, ISBN 978-0-415-04888-0
- Hand, G.J. (1966), "The Forgotten Statutes of Kilkenny: A Brief Survey", Irish Jurist, 1 (2)
- Muldoon, James (2000), "Medieval Notions of Difference", in Lang, Berel (ed.), Race and Racism in Theory and Practice, Rowman & Littlefield, ISBN 0-8476-9693-6
- Simms, Katherine. "Gaelicization", Medieval Ireland: An Encyclopedia, 1st ed. Routledge 2005.
- "The Statutes of Kilkenny", Encyclopedia of Irish History and Culture, 1st ed. Thomson Gale 2004.
