= Settlement of Ireland Act 1695 =

Act of the Parliament of Ireland

- Act of Parliament
- Parliament of Ireland
- Long title: An Act declaring all Attainders and all other Acts made in the late pretended Parliament, to be void.
- Citation: 7 Will. 3. c. 3 (I)
- Introduced by: Henry Capell, Baron Capell of Tewkesbury (Lords)
- Territorial extent: Ireland

Dates
- Royal assent: 4 September 1695
- Repealed: 1962 (Ireland); 1973 (United Kingdom)

Other legislation
- Amended by: Statute Law Revision Act 1953
- Repealed by: Statute Law Revision (Pre-Union Irish Statutes) Act 1962 (Ireland); Statute Law (Repeals) Act 1973 (United Kingdom)

Status
- Republic of Ireland: Repealed
- Northern Ireland: Repealed

Text of statute as originally enacted

The Settlement of Ireland Act 1695 was a 1695 act of the Parliament of Ireland which annulled all legislation passed by James II of England's 1689 Irish "Patriot Parliament" and ordered its official records to be destroyed.

== Background ==
James II had issued writs to summon a parliament to assemble in Dublin in March 1689. This was following his arrival in Ireland and deposition from the English throne in February 1689 owing to the Glorious Revolution of the previous year. The Patriot Parliament which met between 7 May and 20 July 1689 occupied a legally ambiguous position owing to James's contested status as a monarch and the role of the English parliament in authorising Irish legislation under Poynings' Law (on certification of acts). The Patriot Parliament had nonetheless passed acts which sought to reverse Protestant land settlements and assert Irish legislative autonomy.

Therefore, following the Williamite victory in the Williamite War in Ireland, the 2nd Irish parliament of William III which met in 1695 decided to pass an act to systematically erase the Jacobite legislative record and prevent any future legal reliance on the Patriot Parliament's decisions.

== The Act ==
The bill was introduced to the Irish House of Lords by Henry Capell, Baron Capell of Tewkesbury as Lord Deputy of Ireland at the beginning of the parliamentary session in August 1695. The bill was quickly passed by both the Lords and the Irish House of Commons and received royal assent on 4 September 1695.

The act's opening words reasserted that the Kingdom of Ireland was inseparably annexed and belonged to the Kingdom of England. It declared all acts, attainders, patents, and records from the 1689 assembly legally null, void, and of no effect. The act also stipulated that the physical rolls and documents of James II's Irish parliament be openly cancelled and destroyed to prevent any future legal reliance on them, alongside the destruction of any writs, books or journals associated with the assembly. The Patriot Parliament was described dismissively as "persons lately so assembled at Dublin, pretending to be or calling themselves by the name of a Parliament", and later in the text as an "unlawful and rebellious assembly".

== Repeal ==
The act was repealed in the Republic of Ireland by the Statute Law Revision (Pre-Union Irish Statutes) Act 1962. In the United Kingdom, with regard to Northern Ireland, it was amended by the Statute Law Revision Act 1953 before being repealed by the Statute Law (Repeals) Act 1973.
