= List of acts of the Parliament of Ireland, 1169–1192 =

This is a list of acts of the Parliament of Ireland for the years from 1169 to 1192.

The number shown by each act's title is its chapter number. Acts are cited using this number, preceded by the years of the reign during which the relevant parliamentary session was held; thus the act concerning assay passed in 1783 is cited as "23 & 24 Geo. 3 c. 23", meaning the 23rd act passed during the session that started in the 23rd year of the reign of George III and which finished in the 24th year of that reign. The modern convention is to use Arabic numerals in citations (thus "40 Geo. 3" rather than "40 Geo. III"). Acts of the reign of Elizabeth I are formally cited without a regnal numeral in the Republic of Ireland.

Acts passed by the Parliament of Ireland did not have a short title; however, some of these acts have subsequently been given a short title by acts of the Parliament of the United Kingdom, acts of the Parliament of Northern Ireland, or acts of the Oireachtas. This means that some acts have different short titles in the Republic of Ireland and Northern Ireland respectively. Official short titles are indicated by the flags of the respective jurisdictions.

A number of the acts included in this list are still in force in Northern Ireland or the Republic of Ireland. Because these two jurisdictions are entirely separate, the version of an act in force in one may differ from the version in force in the other; similarly, an act may have been repealed in one but not in the other.

A number of acts passed by the Parliament of England also extended to Ireland during this period.

== Hen. 2 (Uncertain date 1169-1189) ==
- Election of a chief governor of Ireland.

== 17 & 18 Hen. 2 (1171-72) ==
- Charter of Hen. 2 to Dublin.

== 18 Hen. 2 (1172) ==
- Charter of Hen. 2 granting Meath to Hugh of Lassy.

== Hen. 2 (Uncertain date after 1171) ==
- Second Dublin Charter from Hen. 2

== Ric. 1 (Uncertain date 1189-1199) ==
- Dublin ale and metheglin
- Mills and millers at Dublin

== 3 Ric. 1 (1192) ==
- Earl John's Dublin Charter

== See also ==
- List of acts of the Parliament of Ireland
- List of acts of the Oireachtas
- List of legislation in the United Kingdom
