= Treason Act (Ireland) 1537 =

Act of the Parliament of Ireland

- Act of Parliament
- Parliament of Ireland
- Long title: An Act of Slaunder.
- Citation: 28 Hen. 8. c. 7 (I); (or 28 & 29 Hen. 8. c. 8 (I))
- Territorial extent: Lordship of Ireland (originally); Northern Ireland (today)

Dates
- Royal assent: 1537
- Commencement: 1537
- Repealed: Republic of Ireland: 1962

Other legislation
- Amended by: Statute Law Revision Act 1953; Statute Law Revision (Ireland) Act 1879]]; Crime and Disorder Act 1998
- Repealed by: Republic of Ireland: Statute Law Revision (Pre-Union Irish Statutes) Act 1962
- Relates to: Treasons Act 1534; Crown of Ireland Act 1542; Treason Act 1842

Status
- Republic of Ireland: Repealed
- Northern Ireland: Amended

Text of statute as originally enacted

The Treason Act (Ireland) 1537 (28 Hen. 8. c. 7 (I), long title An Act of Slaunder) is an act of the former Parliament of Ireland which adds several offences to the law of treason in Ireland. It was repealed in the Republic of Ireland in 1962 (but was obsolete well before then), but is still binding in Northern Ireland today.

The act makes the following conduct treason:

- to "maliciously wish, will, or desire, by words, or writing, or by craft, imagin (sic), invent, practise, or attempt, any bodily harm to be done or committed to the King's most royal person, the Queen", or their heirs apparent;
- or by such means to deprive them of the dignity, title or name of their royal estates;
- to slanderously publish "by express writing, or words" that the Sovereign is a heretic, tyrant, schismatic, infidel or usurper of the Crown; or
- to rebelliously "detain, keep or withhold" from the Sovereign his fortresses, ships, artillery, "or other munitions or fortifications of war", for longer than six days after being commanded to surrender them to the Sovereign.

The penalty for treason was death until 1998 when it was reduced to imprisonment for life or a lesser term. During the debate on the abolition of the death penalty, the 7th Earl of Onslow said:

My Lords, this is the most glorious piece of information one could possibly come across. It has been worth waiting 30 years in your Lordships' House to know that slandering the sovereign in Ireland is still a hanging offence.

== Text ==
Section I of the act reads as follows:

... if any person or persons, after the first day of February next coming, doe maliciously wish, will, or desire, by words, or writing, or by craft, imagin, invent, practise, or attempt, any bodily harm to be done or committed to the King's most royal person, the Queen, or their heyres apparent, or to deprive them, or any of them, of the dignitie, title, or name of their royal estates, or slanderously and maliciously publish and pronounce by express writing, or words, that the King our soveraign lord should be heretick, schismatick, tyrant, infidell, or usurper of the crown, or rebelliously doth detain, keep, or withhold from our said soveraign Lord, his heyres or successors, any of his fortresses, fortilesses or holds, within this realm, or any other the King's dominions or marches, or rebelliously detain, keep, or withhold from the King's said Highness, his heyres or successors, any of his or their ships, ordinances, artillery, or other munitions of fortifications of war, and doe not humbly render and give up to our said soveraign Lord, his heyres or successors, or to such persons as shall be deputed by them, such castles, fortresses, fortilesses, holds, ships, ordnances, artillery, and other munitions and fortifications of war rebelliously kept, or detayned, within six dayes next after they shall be commanded, by our said soveregn Lord, his heyres and successors, by open proclamations under the great seale: that then every such person and persons so offending in any of the premisses, after the said first day of February, their aydors, counsaylors, consentors, and abbettors, being thereof lawfully convicted, according to the laws and customes of this realm, shall be adjudged traditours; and that every such offence in any of the premisses that shall be committed or done after the said first day of February, shall be reputed, accepted, and adjudged high treason, and the offenders therein, and their aydors, consentors, counsailors, and abbettors, being lawfully convict of any such offence as is aforesaid, shall [be liable to imprisonment for life and to such] (Note: The words in square brackets were substituted in Northern Ireland by the Crime and Disorder Act 1998 (c. 37). The text originally read "...shall [have and suffer such pains of death and] other penalties...") other penalties, as is limited and accustomed in cases of high treason.

== See also ==
- Crown of Ireland Act 1542, which also adds further treasons to Northern Irish law, in addition to general UK law.
- High treason in the United Kingdom
- Treason Act
- Misprision of treason
- Treason Act 1842 which also deals with assaults on the Sovereign.

== Bibliography ==
- "The twenty eighth year of Henry the eighth; Chapter VII". The Statutes at Large: From the third year of Edward the Second, A.D. 1310, to the first year of George the Third, A.D. 1761, inclusive. Vol. 1: 1310–1612. Dublin: Boulter Grierson. 1765. pp. 93–96.
