= Counties of Meath and Westmeath Act 1543 =

Irish Act dividing County Meath into Meath and Westmeath

Counties of Meath and Westmeath Act 1543 (Note: Short title given by the Statute Law Revision Act 2007 (No. 28))
- Act of Parliament
- Parliament of Ireland
- Long title: An Act for the division of Meath into two shires.
- Citation: 34 Hen. 8. c. 1 (I)
- Territorial extent: Kingdom of Ireland

Dates
- Royal assent: 1543
- Commencement: 25 November 1542

Status: Current legislation

Text of statute as originally enacted

An Act for the division of Meath into two shires (referred to in the modern Irish Statute Book as the Counties of Meath and Westmeath Act 1543) 34 Hen. 8. c. 1 (I) was an act of the Parliament of Ireland passed in 1542 which resulted in the division of County Meath, shired in 1297, into the counties of Meath and Westmeath. The act commenced on Saint Catherine's Day in 1542 and remains in effect.

== Background ==
Historically, the Kingdom of Meath had been one of the five provinces of Ireland, and at its peak comprised all of modern counties Meath and Westmeath, as well as most of Longford and parts of Cavan, Dublin, Kildare, Louth and Offaly. The seat of the High King of Ireland was located within the Kingdom of Meath at the Hill of Tara, while the Kings of Meath had no fixed seat until the reign of King Máel Sechnaill mac Domnaill in 976 AD, when the fort of Dun-na-Scia near Lough Ennell became the permanent royal residence.

The kingdom collapsed following the Norman Invasion of Ireland in 1169 and was granted by Henry II to the Anglo-Norman lord Hugh de Lacy in 1172, becoming the most extensive liberty in Ireland. The Lordship of Meath covered a large area of almost 6,000 km^{2} (c. 1.5 million acres), which became increasingly unmanageable as English power in Ireland receded throughout the 13th century.

Following several informal divisions and squabbles among de Lacy's descendants over control of the lordship, it was finally divided in 1297 and the much smaller, though still sizable, County of Meath was shired. However, English authority continued to retreat eastward towards The Pale - an area centered around Dublin where English laws and customs were still obeyed. This situation left part of County Meath within the Pale, while other areas which were once loyal to the Crown were now outside the control of the authorities in Dublin. These areas were often referred to by Anglo-Norman officials as "frontiers" or "marches".

An additional anomaly related to the county was the lack of a baronial structure in much of its western areas. Baronies and Cantreds were Norman-era subdivisions of Ireland employed for administrative, justice, taxation, and peerage purposes. Given how extensive the former lordship granted to de Lacy was, many of its western areas were never formally designated, and knowledge of these areas by officials in Dublin was poor. By the 15th century, a beleaguered fort near Mullingar, often burnt by the O'Farrells and located just 80 km (50 miles) from Dublin, was the westernmost outpost that the English controlled in Ireland.

== Provisions ==
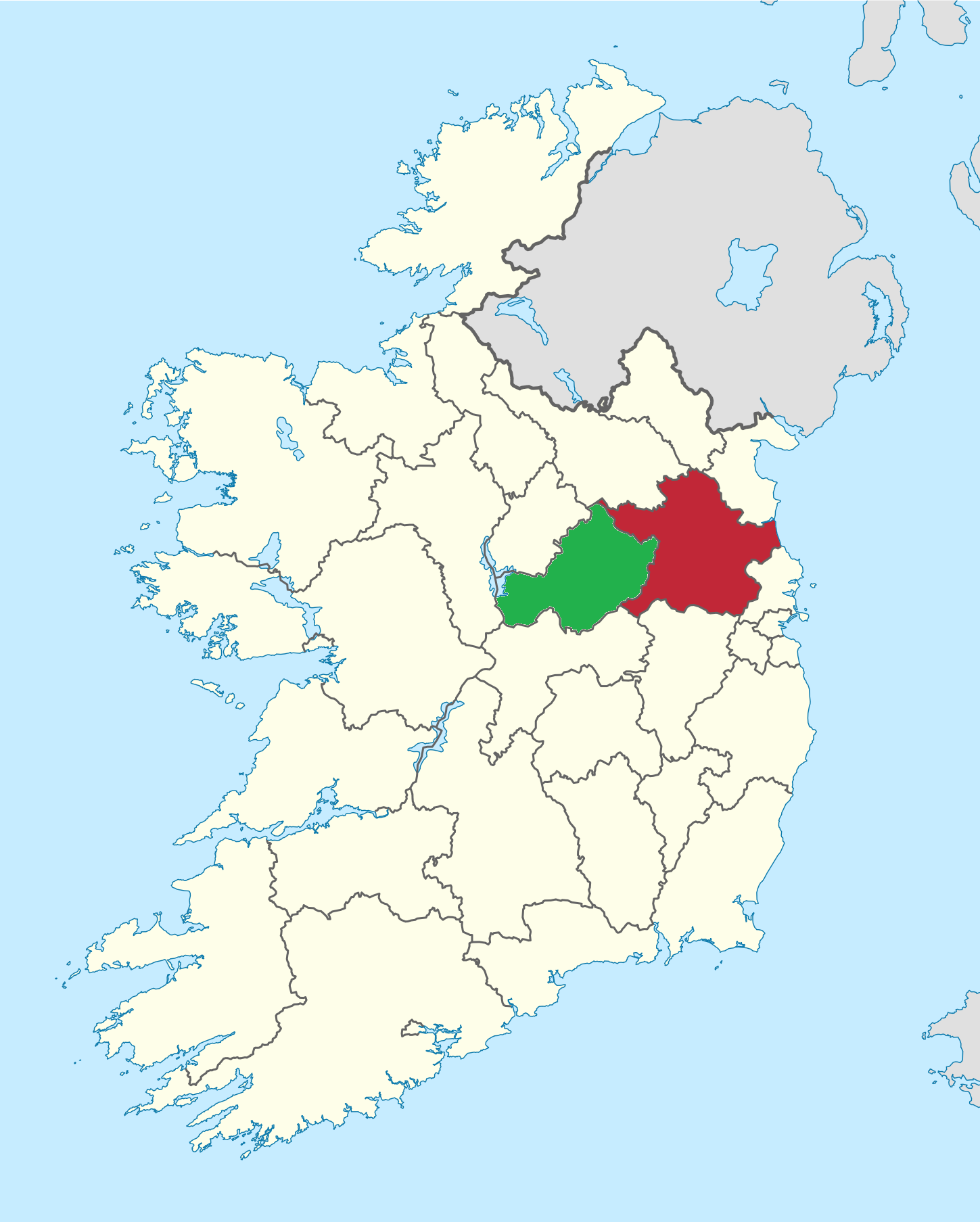
Modern boundaries of Meath (Red) and Westmeath (Green).

The act noted that although Meath was "great and large in circuit, the west part thereof laid about and beset with diverse of King's rebels'" and that in the western part of the county, the High Sheriff of Meath was not able to execute the king's laws. Furthermore, the Act stated that the sheriff most commonly hailed from those areas within the Pale (i.e. modern County Meath) rather than elsewhere in the county.

On the subject of the aim of partition, the Act concludes:

"the said shire shall be divided and made into two shires and one of them shall be named Methe and the other shall be called Countie of Westmethe, and there shall be two sheriffs and other offices convenient within the said shires, and that the kings subjects thereby should greatly increase in obedience unto the Kings Highness and his laws"

Under the partition, the six westernmost baronies of Meath became part of the new shire of Westmeath. The barony of Fore was divided in two, with the western half becoming part of Westmeath. Further west, four new baronies were established along historic Norman marcher lineages, bringing the total number of baronies in the new shire to eleven.

The new baronies created as a result of the act were:

- Dalton's country became the barony of Rathconrath;
- Delamare's country became the barony of Rossaughe;
- Tyrrell's country became the barony of Fartullagh; and
- Dillon's country became the barony of Kilkenny West.

Mullingar was named as the "head and shire town" of Westmeath and a Dominican priory in the area was converted into a jail. Robert Dillon was appointed as the first High Sheriff of Westmeath in 1543.

== Impact ==
The effects of the act were immediately felt within the Pale, which Meath had grown to dominate. Of England's "four shires" (Dublin, Kildare, Meath and Louth), Meath was by far the largest and wealthiest, with the eastern portion characterized by well-populated market towns, nucleated villages and a strong commercial focus on labour-intensive cereal cultivation. Under the older Lordship of Ireland, many of the judges, barristers and government officials such as Lord Chief Justice of Ireland, Chief Baron of the Irish Exchequer and Chief Justice of the Common Pleas for Ireland were born in the county.

Unlike in any other shire, the towns of eastern Meath were protected on all sides - by expansive defensive marches north of Kells and west of Athboy, and surrounded on all other sides by other English-controlled shires. The partition brought Meath more into line with the other shires, certainly in terms of scale, however it remained a significant core-territory, with one English official noting that Meath was "as well inhabited as any shire in England".

Although the Act was most likely a defensive measure to further fortify the boundary between the Irish kingdoms and the Pale, it laid the foundations for the westward conquest of Ireland by the Tudors, along with the expansion of the Kingdom of Ireland which had been proclaimed the previous year by the Crown of Ireland Act 1542. The formal dispossession of Irish clans and organised English settlement would be first attempted 14 years later through the passing of the Settlement of Laois and Offaly Act 1556 and their creation into new English shires. This process was repeated throughout Ireland in the late 16th century, culminating in the full conquest of the island by 1607.

== Current status ==
As of the Local Government Act 2001, Meath and Westmeath are designated as administrative counties within the Republic of Ireland, and are governed by Meath County Council and Westmeath County Council respectively.

The Statute Law Revision Act 2007, enacted by the Oireachtas, repealed a large amount of pre-1922 legislation of Ireland, England, Great Britain and the United Kingdom while preserving a shorter list of statutes. The act was the largest single Statute Law Revision Act or repealing measure ever enacted internationally. Schedule 1 of the Statute Law Revision Act retained the Counties of Meath and Westmeath Act, re-affirming the status of Meath and Westmeath as two separate entities.

Although there is often (usually satirical) discussion within Ireland of Meath and Westmeath re-unifying, proposals to do so have never been seriously considered at either local authority or national level.

In June 2020, a social media campaign entitled "Meath Reunification 2021" was launched, which included a submission to the Westmeath County Development Plan 2021-2027 calling on Westmeath County Council to consider reunification. Meath West TD Peadar Tóibín lent his support to the campaign on Twitter.
