= Fisheries (Ireland) Act 1842 =

Act of the Parliament of the United Kingdom

Fisheries (Ireland) Act 1842 (Note: The citation of this act by this short title was authorised by section 1 of, and the first schedule to, the Short Titles Act 1896. Due to the repeal of those provisions it is now authorised by section 19(2) of the Interpretation Act 1978.)
- Act of Parliament
- Parliament of the United Kingdom
- Long title: An Act to regulate the Irish Fisheries.
- Citation: 5 & 6 Vict. c. 106
- Territorial extent: United Kingdom

Dates
- Royal assent: 10 August 1842
- Commencement: 10 August 1842 (Note: The Acts of Parliament (Commencement) Act 1793.)
Other legislation
Amends	See § Repealed enactments
Repeals/revokes	See § Repealed enactments
Amended by	Fisheries Act (Northern Ireland) 1966

Status: Partially repealed

Text of statute as originally enacted

The Fisheries (Ireland) Act 1842 (5 & 6 Vict. c. 106) is an act of the Parliament of the United Kingdom that consolidated and amended the enactments then in force relating to the fisheries of Ireland.

== Provisions ==
=== Repealed enactments ===
Section 1 of the act repealed 26 enactments, so far as they related to the fisheries of Ireland, listed in that section.

Citation	Short title	Description	Extent of repeal
5 Edw. 4. c. 6 (I)	N/A	An Act that no Ship or other Vessel of any Foreign Country shall go to fishing in the Irish Countries; and for Custom to be paid off the Vessel that cometh from Foreign Lands to fishing.	The whole act.
28 Hen. 8. c. 22 (I)	Inland Navigation Act 1537	An Act for the Wears upon the Barrow and other Waters in the County of Kilkenny.	So far as relates to the destroying of salmon fry.
11 Eliz. 1. Sess. 3. c. 4 (I)	Salmon and Eel Fisheries Act 1568	An Act for the Preservation of Salmon Fry and Eel Fry.	The whole act.
10 Chas. 1 Sess. 2. c. 24 (I)	Sea Coast Fishing and Fishermen Relief Act 1634	An Act for the better Preservation of Fishing in the Counties of Dublin, Wicklow, Wexford, Waterford, Cork, Kerry, Clare, Galway, Mayo, Sligo, and all other Counties and Places within the Realm of Ireland and the Dominions thereof adjoining to the Sea Coast, and for the Relief of Balkers, Corders, and Fishermen against malicious Suits.	The whole act.
10 Chas. 1 Sess. 3. c. 14 (I)	Fisheries Protection Act 1634	An Act against the killing of young Spawn and Fry of Eels and Salmon.	The whole act.
10 Will. 3. c. 8 (I)	Deer Protection Act 1698	An Act for the Preservation of the Game, and the more easy Conviction of such as shall destroy the same.	So far as relates to the preservation of fish, and prevents the persons therein specified from fishing.
2 Geo. 1. c. 21 (I)	Salmon Fishing Act 1715	An Act to prevent the Destruction of Salmon Fry, and better preserving the Salmon Fishery in this Kingdom.	The whole act.
12 Geo. 1. c. 7 (I)	Salmon Fishery Preservation Act 1725	An Act for the better preserving the Salmon Fishery of this Kingdom.	The whole act.
5 Geo. 2. c. 11 (I)	Inland Navigation Act 1731	An Act for explaining and amending an Act made in the Twenty-eighth Year of the Reign of King Henry the Eighth, intituled An Act for the Wears upon the Barrow and other Waters in the County of Kilkenny.	So far as relates to fishermen or apprentices fishing in navigable rivers or waters.
31 Geo. 2. c. 13 (I)	Salmon and Herring Fisheries Act 1757	An Act to explain and amend the several Laws made in this Kingdom for the more effectual Preservation of Salmon Fish and Fry, and for the better Improvement of the Herring Fishery.	The whole act.
3 Geo. 3. c. 35 (I)	Salmon Preservation Act 1763	An Act to explain and amend the several Laws made in this Kingdom, for the effectual Preservation of Salmon Fish.	The whole act.
13 & 14 Geo. 3. c. 41 (I)	Statutes Continuance and Dublin Trawling Act 1773	An Act for renewing and continuing several temporary Statutes, and to prevent the destructive Practice of trawling for Fish in the Bay of Dublin.	So far as relates to the trawling for fish in the Bay of Dublin.
15 & 16 Geo. 3. c. 31 (I)	Meath Hospital Act 1775	An Act for amending and rendering more effectual an Act passed in the last Session of Parliament, intituled An Act for renewing and continuing several temporary Statutes, and to prevent the destructive Practice of trawling for Fish in the Bay of Dublin; and for explaining and amending one other Act made in the Thirteenth and Fourteenth Years of His present Majesty, intituled An Act for explaining an Act passed in the Fifth Year of His present Majesty's Reign, intituled An Act for erecting and establishing Infirmaries or Hospitals in this Kingdom.	So far as relates to the practice of trawling in the Broad of Lambay.
17 & 18 Geo. 3. c. 19 (I)	Inland Fisheries Act 1777	An Act for the better Preservation of Fish in Rivers, Lakes, and Inland Waters.	The whole act.
23 & 24 Geo. 3. c. 40 (I)	Inland Fisheries Act 1783	An Act for the Protection and Improvement of the Inland Fisheries of this Kingdom.	The whole act.
26 Geo. 3. c. 50 (I)	Inland Fisheries Act 1786	An Act to explain and amend an Act passed in the Twenty-third and Twenty-fourth Years of His present Majesty, intituled An Act for the Protection and Improvement of the Inland Fisheries in this Kingdom.	The whole act.
32 Geo. 3. c. 40 (I)	Expiring Laws Continuance Act 1792	An Act for reviving and continuing certain temporary Statutes.	So far as relates to the River Anna Liffey, or any right of fishery therein.
33 Geo. 3. c. 50 (I)	Fisheries Act 1793	An Act for the Encouragement of the Fisheries in this Kingdom, and for continuing certain Acts respecting the same.	The whole act.
36 Geo. 3. c. 52 (I)	Sea Fisheries Act 1796	An Act for continuing and amending the several Acts for the further Improvement and Extension of the Fisheries on the Coasts of this Kingdom.	The whole act.
39 Geo. 3. c. 51 (I)	Inland Fisheries Act 1799	An Act to revive and amend an Act passed in the Twenty-sixth Year of the Reign of His present Majesty, intituled An Act to explain and amend an Act passed in the Twenty-third and Twenty-fourth Years of the Reign of His present Majesty, intituled An Act for the Protection and Improvement of the Inland Fisheries of this Kingdom.	The whole act.
59 Geo. 3. c. 109	Irish Fisheries Act 1819	An Act for the further Encouragement and Improvement of the Irish Fisheries.	The whole act.
5 Geo. 4. c. 64	Fisheries Act 1824	An Act to amend the several Acts for the Encouragement and Improvement of the British and Irish Fisheries.	So far as relates to Ireland.
7 Geo. 4. c. 34	British and Irish Fisheries Act 1826	An Act to amend an Act of the Fifth Year of His present Majesty, for amending the several Acts for the Encouragement and Improvement of the British and Irish Fisheries.	So far as relates to Ireland.
10 Geo. 4. c. 33	Irish Fisheries Act 1829	An Act to amend the several Acts for the Encouragement of the Irish Fisheries.	The whole act.
11 Geo. 4 & 1 Will. 4. c. 54	N/A	An Act to revive, continue, and amend several Acts relating to the Fisheries.	So far as relates to Ireland.
1 & 2 Vict. c. 76	Inland Fisheries (Ireland) Act 1838	An Act to explain and amend certain Provisions in Acts of the Parliament of Ireland for the Protection of Fisheries in that Kingdom.	The whole act.

== Subsequent developments ==
Most of the act, so far as it applied to Northern Ireland, was repealed, subject to a saving described below, by section 211 of, and schedule 8 to, the Fisheries Act (Northern Ireland) 1966 (1966 c. 17 (N.I.)), which came into operation on a date appointed by order under section 213 of that act. The repeal did not extend to sections 86, 87, 89 to 92, 96 and 103 of the 1842 act, so far as those sections remained applicable for the purposes of the Steam Trawling (Ireland) Act 1889 (so far as unrepealed) and the Whale Fisheries (Ireland) Act 1908.

In the part of Ireland that became independent of the United Kingdom, the act was repealed, along with the other enactments forming the earlier code of Irish fishery law, by the Fisheries (Consolidation) Act 1959, an act of the Oireachtas of the Republic of Ireland.
