= Acts of Union 1800 =

Acts of the Parliaments of Great Britain and Ireland which united those two Kingdoms

Union with Ireland Act 1800 (Note: The citation of this act by this short title was authorised by section 1 of, and the first schedule to, the Short Titles Act 1896. Due to the repeal of those provisions, it is now authorised by section 19 (2) of the Interpretation Act 1978.)
- Act of Parliament
- Parliament of Great Britain
- Long title: An Act for the Union of Great Britain and Ireland
- Citation: 39 & 40 Geo. 3. c. 67
- Territorial extent: Great Britain

Dates
- Royal assent: 2 July 1800
- Commencement: 31 December 1800—1 January 1801 (Note: Article 1.)
Other legislation
Amended by	Statute Law Revision Act 1871; Irish Free State (Consequential Adaptation of Enactments) Order 1923; Criminal Justice Act 1948; Representation of the People Act 1949; Statute Law Revision Act 1953; Peerage Act 1963; Criminal Law Act 1967; Statute Law (Repeals) Act 1971; Statute Law (Repeals) Act 1993; Judicature (Northern Ireland) Act 1978
Relates to	Crown of Ireland Act 1542; Government of Ireland Act 1920; Irish Free State Constitution Act 1922; Irish Free State (Consequential Provisions) Act 1922; Ireland Act 1949; Northern Ireland Constitution Act 1973; Northern Ireland Act 1998

Status: Amended

Status
- England and Wales: Amended
- Scotland: Amended
- Republic of Ireland: Repealed by the Statute Law Revision Act 1983
- Northern Ireland: Amended

Text of statute as originally enacted

Text of the Acts of Union 1800 as in force today (including any amendments) within the United Kingdom, from legislation.gov.uk.

Act of Union (Ireland) 1800 (Note: Short title given by Short Titles Act (Northern Ireland) 1951 (c. 1 (N.I.)).)
- Act of Parliament
- Parliament of Ireland
- Long title: An Act for the Union of Great Britain and Ireland
- Citation: 40 Geo. 3. c. 38 (I)
- Introduced by: John Toler
- Territorial extent: Ireland

Dates
- Royal assent: 1 August 1800
- Commencement: 31 December 1800—1 January 1801
- Repealed: 24 November 1962
Other legislation
Amended by	Statute Law Revision (Ireland) Act 1879; Criminal Justice Act 1948; Statute Law Revision Act 1953; Peerage Act 1963; Statute Law (Repeals) Act 1971; Judicature (Northern Ireland) Act 1978; Statute Law (Repeals) Act 1993
Repealed by	Statute Law Revision (Pre-Union Irish Statutes) Act, 1962
Relates to	Crown of Ireland Act 1542; Government of Ireland Act 1920; Irish Free State Constitution Act 1922; Constitution of Ireland; Republic of Ireland Act 1948

Status: Amended

Status
- Republic of Ireland: Repealed by the Statute Law Revision (Pre-Union Irish Statutes) Act 1962
- Northern Ireland: Amended

History of passage through Parliament

Text of statute as originally enacted

Revised text of statute as amended

The Acts of Union 1800 (Irish: Achtanna an Aontais 1800) were parallel acts of the Parliament of Great Britain and the Parliament of Ireland which united the Kingdom of Great Britain and the Kingdom of Ireland (previously in personal union) to create the United Kingdom of Great Britain and Ireland. The acts came into force between 31 December 1800 and 1 January 1801, and the merged Parliament of the United Kingdom had its first meeting on 22 January 1801.

Provisions of the acts remain in force, with amendments and some Articles repealed, in the United Kingdom, but they have been repealed in their entirety in the Republic of Ireland.

== Citation ==
Two acts were passed in 1800 with the same long title: An Act for the Union of Great Britain and Ireland. The short title of the act of the British Parliament is Union with Ireland Act 1800 (39 & 40 Geo. 3. c. 67), assigned by the Short Titles Act 1896. The short title of the act of the Irish Parliament is Act of Union (Ireland) 1800 (40 Geo. 3. c. 38 (I)), assigned by a 1951 act of the Parliament of Northern Ireland, and hence not effective in the Republic of Ireland, where it was referred to by its long title when repealed in 1962.

== Background ==
Before the titular acts, Ireland had been in personal union with England—since 1542, when the Irish Parliament had passed the Crown of Ireland Act 1542 (33 Hen. 8. c. 1 (I)), proclaiming King Henry VIII of England to be King of Ireland. The King of England had been technical overlord of the Lordship of Ireland, a papal possession, since the 12th century. Both the Kingdoms of Ireland and England later came into personal union with that of Scotland, with the Union of the Crowns in 1603.

In 1707, the Kingdom of England and the Kingdom of Scotland were united into a single kingdom: the Kingdom of Great Britain. Upon that union, each House of the Parliament of Ireland passed a congratulatory address to Queen Anne, praying that she: "May God put it in your royal heart to add greater strength and lustre to your crown, by a still more comprehensive Union". The Irish Parliament was both before then subject to certain restrictions that made it subordinate to the Parliament of England, and after, to the Parliament of Great Britain; however, Ireland gained effective legislative independence from Great Britain through the Constitution of 1782.

By this time access to institutional power in Ireland was restricted to a small minority: the Anglo-Irish of the Protestant Ascendancy. Frustration among the Catholic majority at the lack of reform, along with other reasons, eventually led to a rebellion in 1798, involving a French invasion of Ireland and the seeking of complete independence from Great Britain. This rebellion was crushed with much bloodshed, and the motion for union was motivated at least in part by the belief that the union would alleviate the political rancour that led to the rebellion. The rebellion was felt to have been exacerbated as much by reactionary loyalists as by United Irishmen (anti-unionists).

Furthermore, Catholic emancipation was being discussed in Great Britain, and fears that a newly enfranchised Catholic majority would drastically change the character of the Irish government and parliament also contributed to a desire from London to merge the Parliaments.

According to historian James Stafford, an Enlightenment critique of Empire in Ireland laid the intellectual foundations for the Acts of Union, in which Enlightenment thinkers connected "the exclusion of the Irish Kingdom from free participation in imperial and European trade with the exclusion of its Catholic subjects, under the terms of the penal laws, from the benefits of property and political representation", critiques that were used to justify a parliamentary union between Britain and Ireland.

=== Population and geography ===
Name	Flag	Population	Population (%)	Area (km^{2})	Area (%)	Pop. density (per km^{2})
Kingdom of Great Britain		10,500,000	65%	230,977	73%	45.46
Kingdom of Ireland		5,500,000	35%	84,421	27%	65.15
United Kingdom of Great Britain and Ireland		16,000,000	100%	315,093	100%	50.78

== Passage ==
Complementary acts were enacted by the Parliament of Great Britain and the Parliament of Ireland.

The Parliament of Ireland had recently gained a large measure of legislative independence under the Constitution of 1782. Many members of the Irish Parliament jealously guarded that autonomy (notably Henry Grattan), and a motion for union was legally rejected in 1799. Only Anglicans were permitted to become members of the Parliament of Ireland though the great majority of the Irish population were Roman Catholic, with many Presbyterians in Ulster. Under the Roman Catholic Relief Act 1793, Roman Catholics regained the right to vote if they owned or rented property worth £2 annually. Wealthy Catholics were strongly in favour of union in the hope for rapid religious emancipation and the right to sit as MPs, which would only come to pass under the Roman Catholic Relief Act 1829 (10 Geo. 4. c. 7).

From the perspective of Great Britain's elites, the union was desirable because of the uncertainty that followed the French Revolution of 1789 and the Irish Rebellion of 1798. If Ireland adopted Catholic emancipation willingly or not, a Roman Catholic Parliament could break away from Britain and ally with the French, but the same measure within the United Kingdom would exclude that possibility. Also, in creating a regency when King George III was rendered unfit to rule by his health issues, the Irish and British Parliaments gave the Prince Regent different powers. These considerations led Great Britain to decide to attempt the merger of both kingdoms and Parliaments.

The final passage of the Act in the Irish House of Commons turned on an about 16% relative majority, garnering 58% of the votes, and similar in the Irish House of Lords, in part per contemporary accounts through bribery with the awarding of peerages and honours to critics to get votes. The first attempt had been defeated in the Irish House of Commons by 109 votes to 104, but the second vote in 1800 passed by 158 to 115.

The bill received royal assent on 1 August 1800.

== Provisions ==
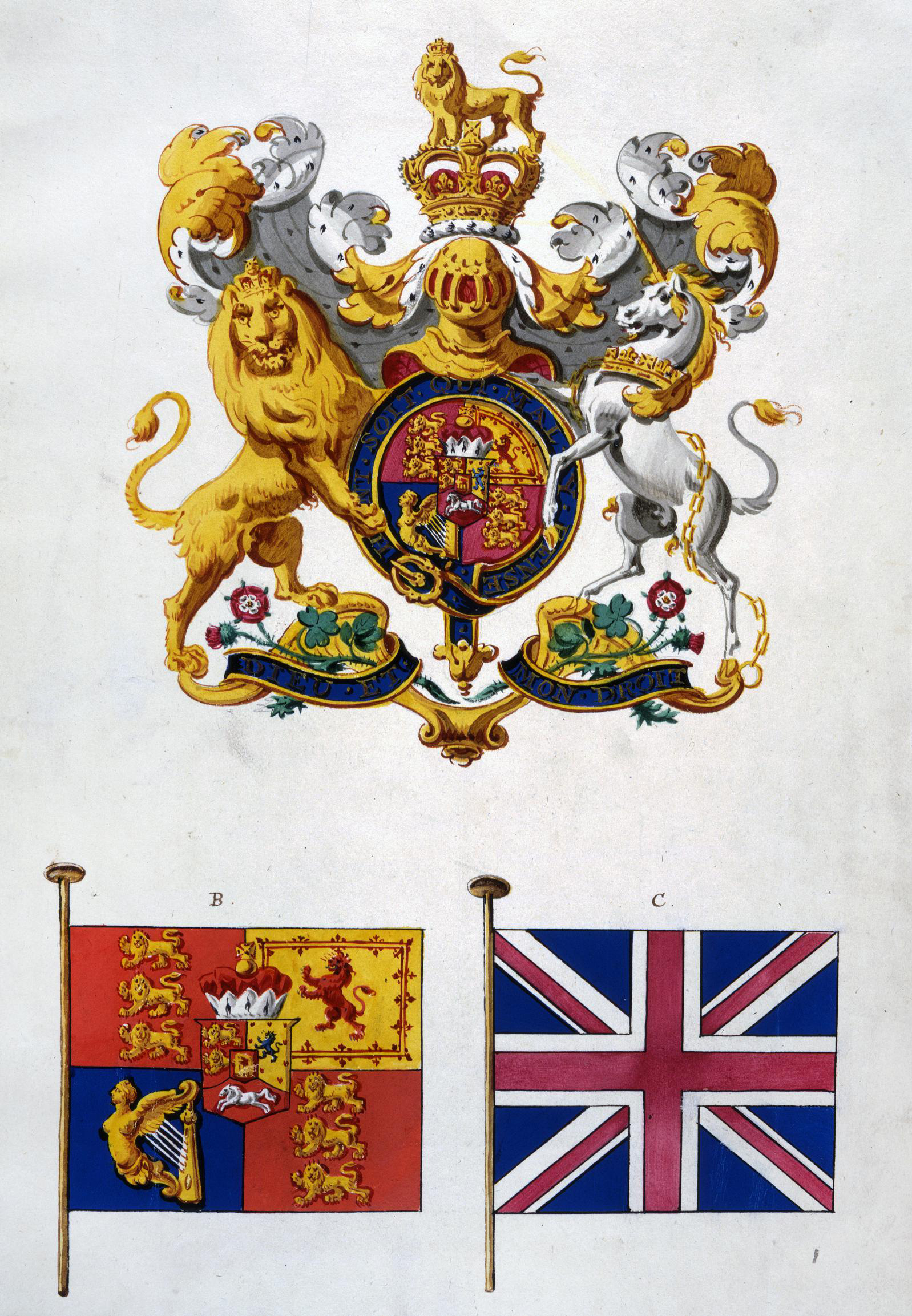
Order in Council of November 1800, illustrating the new arms, flag, and royal standard of the United Kingdom

=== Complementary acts ===
The Acts of Union were two complementary Acts, namely:

- The Union with Ireland Act 1800 (39 & 40 Geo. 3 c. 67), an Act of the Parliament of Great Britain, and
- The Act of Union (Ireland) 1800 (40 Geo. 3 c. 38), an Act of the Parliament of Ireland.

They were passed by their respective parliaments, on 2 July 1800 and 1 August 1800, and came into force on 1 January 1801.

=== Eight articles ===
They ratified eight articles which had been previously agreed by the British and Irish parliaments:

- Articles I–IV dealt with the political aspects of the Union. It created a united parliament.
  - In the House of Lords, the existing members of the Parliament of Great Britain were joined by, as Lords Spiritual, four bishops of the Church of Ireland, rotating among the dioceses in each session and as Lords Temporal 28 Irish representative peers elected for life by the Peerage of Ireland.
  - The House of Commons was to include the pre-union representation from Great Britain and 100 members from Ireland.
- Article V united the established Church of England and Church of Ireland into "one Protestant Episcopal Church, to be called, The United Church of England and Ireland"; but also confirmed the independence of the Church of Scotland.
- Article VI created a customs union, with the exception that customs duties on certain British and Irish goods passing between the two countries would remain for 10 years (a consequence of having trade depressed by the ongoing war with revolutionary France).
  - The High Court of Northern Ireland ruled that parts of this Article as it applied to the UK were "impliedly repealed" by the passage of the European Union (Withdrawal) Act 2020. This decision was upheld on appeal by the Supreme Court of the United Kingdom.
- Article VII stated that Ireland would have to contribute two-seventeenths towards the expenditure of the United Kingdom. The figure was a ratio of Irish to British foreign trade.
- Article VIII formalised the legal and judicial aspects of the Union.

=== Union appeal ===
Part of the appeal of the Union for many Irish Catholics was the promise of Catholic emancipation, allowing Roman Catholic MPs, who had not been permitted to sit in the Irish Parliament, to sit in the United Kingdom Parliament. This, however, was blocked by King George III, who argued that emancipating Roman Catholics would breach his Coronation Oath, and thus was not realised until the Roman Catholic Relief Act 1829.

=== Fate of the Irish Army ===
The traditionally separate Irish Army, which had been funded by the Irish Parliament, was merged into the larger British Army.

=== The first parliament ===
In the first Parliament of the United Kingdom of Great Britain and Ireland, the members of the House of Commons were not elected afresh. By royal proclamation authorised by the Act, all the members of the last House of Commons from Great Britain took seats in the new House, and from Ireland 100 members were chosen from the last Irish House of Commons: two members from each of the 32 counties and the two largest boroughs, and one from each of the next 31 largest boroughs and from Dublin University, chosen by lot. The other 84 Irish parliamentary boroughs were disfranchised; all were pocket boroughs, whose patrons received £15,000 compensation for the loss of what was considered their property.

== Flags and styles ==
Change in the Union Flag

Earlier flag of Great Britain,
prior to the union with Ireland

The second Union Flag,
incorporating the Irish Saint Patrick's Saltire

The Union Flag, created as a consequence of the union of the Kingdom of Great Britain and Ireland in 1800, still remains the flag of the United Kingdom. Called the Union Jack, it combined the flags of St George's Cross (which was deemed to include Wales) and the St Andrew's Saltire of Scotland with the St Patrick's Saltire to represent Ireland.

At the same time, a new Royal Title was adopted ('GEORGE the THIRD by the Grace of God of the United Kingdom of Great Britain and Ireland King, Defender of the Faith'), and a new shield of arms. In adopting these, the moribund English claims to the French throne were not continued: the title 'King of France' was abandoned and the fleur-de-lis were removed from the Royal Standard of the United Kingdom for the first time since the Middle Ages.

== Literature cited ==
- Ward, Alan J. (1994). The Irish Constitutional Tradition: Responsible Government and Modern Ireland 1782–1992. Newbridge, Ireland: Irish Academic Press.
