= List of acts of the Parliament of Ireland, 1600–1690 =

This is a list of acts of the Parliament of Ireland for the years from 1600 to 1690.

The number shown by each act's title is its chapter number. Acts are cited using this number, preceded by the years of the reign during which the relevant parliamentary session was held; thus the act concerning assay passed in 1783 is cited as "23 & 24 Geo. 3 c. 23", meaning the 23rd act passed during the session that started in the 23rd year of the reign of George III and which finished in the 24th year of that reign. Note that the modern convention is to use Arabic numerals in citations (thus "40 Geo. 3" rather than "40 Geo. III"). Acts of the reign of Elizabeth I are formally cited without a regnal numeral in the Republic of Ireland.

Acts passed by the Parliament of Ireland did not have a short title; however, some of these acts have subsequently been given a short title by acts of the Parliament of the United Kingdom, acts of the Parliament of Northern Ireland, or acts of the Oireachtas. This means that some acts have different short titles in the Republic of Ireland and Northern Ireland respectively. Official short titles are indicated by the flags of the respective jurisdictions.

A number of the acts included in this list are still in force in Northern Ireland or the Republic of Ireland. Because these two jurisdictions are entirely separate, the version of an act in force in one may differ from the version in force in the other; similarly, an act may have been repealed in one but not in the other.

A number of acts passed by the Parliament of England also extended to Ireland during this period.

== 1610-1619 ==
=== 11, 12 & 13 Jas. 1 (1613) ===
The parliament of James I, which met from 18 May 1613 until 24 October 1615.

This session was also traditionally cited as 11, 12, 13 Jas. 1, 11, 12 & 13 Jac. 1, 11, 12, 13 Jac. 1, 11, 12 & 13 J. 1 and 11, 12, 13 J. 1.

Short title, or popular name	Citation	Royal assent
Long title
Crown of Ireland Act 1613 (repealed)	11, 12 & 13 Jas. 1. c. 1 (I)	
A most joyfull and just recognition of his Majesties lawful, undoubted, and absolute right and title to the crowne of Ireland. (Repealed by Statute Law Revision (Ireland) Act 1878 (41 & 42 Vict. c. 57))
Piracy Act 1613^{(Republic of Ireland)}	11, 12 & 13 Jas. 1. c. 2 (I)	
An Act for the punishing of Pyrates and robbers on the Sea.
Benefit of Clergy Act 1613 (repealed)	11, 12 & 13 Jas. 1. c. 3 (I)	
An Act for taking away of Clergy in certain Cases of Felonies, and for Deliverie of Clerakes Convict with Purgation. (Repealed by Offences Against the Person (Ireland) Act 1829 (10 Geo. 4. c. 34))
	11, 12 & 13 Jas. 1. c. 4 (I)	
(Unknown)
Natives of Ireland Statutes Repeal Act 1613 (repealed)	11, 12 & 13 Jas. 1. c. 5 (I)	
An Act for Repeale of diverse Statutes concerning the Natives of this Kingdom of Ireland. (Repealed by Statute Law Revision (Ireland) Act 1878 (41 & 42 Vict. c. 57))
Scots Act Repeal Act 1613 (repealed)	11, 12 & 13 Jas. 1. c. 6 (I)	
An Act for Repeale of one Statute made against bringing in of Scotts, retayning of them, and marrying with them. (Repealed by Statute Law Revision (Ireland) Act 1878 (41 & 42 Vict. c. 57))
Highways Act 1613	11, 12 & 13 Jas. 1. c. 7 (I)	
Outlawry Act 1613 (repealed)	11, 12 & 13 Jas. 1. c. 8 (I)	
An Act for the avoyding of privie and secret outlawries of His Majesties subjects in personall actions. (Repealed for the Republic of Ireland by Statute Law Revision (Pre-Union Irish Statutes) Act 1962 (No. 29) and for Northern Ireland by the Statute Law Revision Act 1950 (14 Geo. 6. c. 6))
General Pardon Act 1613 (repealed)	11, 12 & 13 Jas. 1. c. 9 (I)	
An Act for the Kings Majesties most gratious, generall and free pardon. (Repealed by Statute Law Revision (Ireland) Act 1878 (41 & 42 Vict. c. 57))
Subsidy Act 1613	11, 12 & 13 Jas. 1. c. 10 (I)	
An Act for grauntinge of one entire Subsidie by the Temporaltye.

== 1630-1639 ==
=== 10 Chas. 1 (1634) ===
The 1st session of the 1st Parliament of Charles I, which met from 14 July 1634 until 2 August 1634.

This session was also traditionally cited as 10 Car. 1 and 10 C. 1.

Short title, or popular name	Citation	Royal assent
Long title
Subsidies Act 1634 (repealed)	10 Chas. 1. c. 1 (I) (Note: Also cited as 11, 12, & 13 Jas. 1)	
An Act for the Grant of Four Intire Subsidies, by the Temporality. (Repealed by Statute Law Revision (Ireland) Act 1878 (41 & 42 Vict. c. 57))
Further Subsidies Act 1634 (repealed)	10 Chas. 1. c. 2 (I)	
An Act for the further Granting of Two Intire Subsidies, by the Temporality, above the Four Subsidies now Granted by this present Parliament. (Repealed by Statute Law Revision (Ireland) Act 1878 (41 & 42 Vict. c. 57))
Defective Titles Act 1634	10 Chas. 1. c. 3 (I)	
An Act for confirming of letters patent hereafter to be past upon his Majesties commission of grace for the remedy of defective titles. (Repealed for the Republic of Ireland by Statute Law Revision (Pre-Union Irish Statutes) Act 1962 (No. 29))
Parliament Act 1634 (repealed)	10 Chas. 1. c. 4 (I)	
An Act that this Session of Parliament shall not determine by his Majestie's Royal Assent to some Bills. (Repealed by Statute Law Revision (Ireland) Act 1878 (41 & 42 Vict. c. 57))

=== 10 Chas. 1. Sess. 2 (1634) ===
The 2nd session of the 1st Parliament of Charles I, which met from 4 November 1634 until 15 December 1634.

This session was also traditionally cited as 10 Car. 1. Sess. 2, 10 Car. 1. Stat. 2, 10 Car. 1. St. 2, 10 Car. 1. st. 2, 10 C. 1. Sess. 2, 10 C. 1. Stat. 2, 10 C. 1. St. 2 and 10 C. 1. st. 2.

Short title, or popular name	Citation	Royal assent
Long title
Statute of Uses 1634^{(Republic of Ireland)}	10 Chas. 1 Sess. 2. c. 1 (I)	
An Act expressing an Order for Uses, Willis and Inrolments.
Wills, Wards, and Prime Seisin Act 1634	10 Chas. 1 Sess. 2. c. 2 (I)	
An Act how Lands, Tenements, &c. may be disposed by Will or otherwise, and concerning Wards and Prime Seisin.
Conveyancing Act 1634^{(Republic of Ireland)}	10 Chas. 1 Sess. 2. c. 3 (I)	
An Act against Covenous and Fraudulent Conveyances.
Grantees of Reversions Act 1634	10 Chas. 1 Sess. 2. c. 4 (I)	
An Act concerning grantees of reversions, to take advantage of breaches of conditions &c. (Repealed for the Republic of Ireland by Statute Law Revision (Pre-Union Irish Statutes) Act 1962 (No. 29))
Rent Arrears Recovery Act 1634 (repealed)	10 Chas. 1 Sess. 2. c. 5 (I)	
An Act for Recovery of Arrearages of Rents by Executors of Tenant in Fee Simple. (Repealed by Landlord and Tenant Law Amendment (Ireland) Act 1860 (23 & 24 Vict. c. 154))
Trespass Act 1634^{(Republic of Ireland)} or the Limitation Act (Ireland) 1634	10 Chas. 1 Sess. 2. c. 6 (I)	
An Act for Limitation of Actions, and for Avoiding Sutes in law. (Repealed for Northern Ireland by Statute Law (Repeals) Act 1986 (c. 12))
Wrongful Disseisin Act 1634 (repealed)	10 Chas. 1 Sess. 2. c. 7 (I)	
An Act that wrongful Disseisin, &c. is no Discent in law. (Repealed by Statute Law Revision (Ireland) Act 1878 (41 & 42 Vict. c. 57))
Exposition of the Statute of Fines Act 1634	10 Chas. 1 Sess. 2. c. 8 (I)	
An Act for the Exposition of the Statute of Fines.
Proclamations upon Fines Act 1634 (repealed)	10 Chas. 1 Sess. 2. c. 9 (I)	
An Act touching Proclamations upon Fines. (Repealed by Statute Law Revision (Ireland) Act 1878 (41 & 42 Vict. c. 57))
Errors in Fines and Recoveries Act 1634 (repealed)	10 Chas. 1 Sess. 2. c. 10 (I)	
An Act for the Reformation of Errors in Fines and Recoveries. (Repealed by Statute Law Revision (Ireland) Act 1878 (41 & 42 Vict. c. 57))
Expedition of Justice (Demurrers) Act 1634 (repealed)	10 Chas. 1 Sess. 2. c. 11 (I)	
An Act for the Expedition of Justice in cases of Demurrers, &c. (Repealed by Statute Law Revision (Ireland) Act 1878 (41 & 42 Vict. c. 57))
Reformation of Feofailes Act 1634 (repealed)	10 Chas. 1 Sess. 2. c. 12 (I)	
An Act for Reformation of Feofailes, &c. (Repealed by Statute Law Revision (Ireland) Act 1878 (41 & 42 Vict. c. 57))
Jurors Appearance Act 1634 (repealed)	10 Chas. 1 Sess. 2. c. 13 (I)	
An Act concerning the Appearance of Jurors, in the Nisi prius. (Repealed by Juries (Ireland) Act 1833 (3 & 4 Will. 4. c. 91))
Demise of the Crown Act (Ireland) 1634 (repealed)	10 Chas. 1 Sess. 2. c. 14 (I)	
An Act for the continuance of actions after the death of any King. (Repealed for the Republic of Ireland by Statute Law Revision (Pre-Union Irish Statutes) Act 1962 (No. 29) and for Northern Ireland by Judicature (Northern Ireland) Act 1978 (c. 23))
Annuity and Debt Actions Act 1634 (repealed)	10 Chas. 1 Sess. 2. c. 15 (I)	
Like Process shall be had in every Writ of Annuity, and certain other Actions, as in an Action of Debt. (Repealed by Statute Law Revision (Ireland) Act 1878 (41 & 42 Vict. c. 57))
Ease in Pleading and Officers Protection Act 1634	10 Chas. 1 Sess. 2. c. 16 (I)	
An Act for ease in Pleading, against troublesom and contentious Sutes, Prosecuted against Sheriffs, Justices of the Peace, Mayors, Constables, and certain other Officers, for the lawful Execution of their Office.
Nonsuit Costs Act 1634 (repealed)	10 Chas. 1 Sess. 2. c. 17 (I)	
An Act that where the plaintiffe is non-suited, the defendant shall recover costs. (Repealed for the Republic of Ireland by Statute Law Revision (Pre-Union Irish Statutes) Act 1962 (No. 29) and for Northern Ireland by the Statute Law Revision Act 1950 (14 Geo. 6. c. 6))
Justices of the Peace (Prisoners) Act 1634 (repealed)	10 Chas. 1 Sess. 2. c. 18 (I)	
An Act appointing an Order to Justices of the Peace, touching the Bailment, committing and taking Examination of Prisoners, &c. (Repealed by Criminal Statutes (Ireland) Repeal Act 1828 (9 Geo. 4. c. 53))
Murders and Felonies Trial Act 1634 (repealed)	10 Chas. 1 Sess. 2. c. 19 (I)	
An Act for the Tryal of Murders and Felonies, Committed in several Counties, &c. (Repealed by Criminal Statutes (Ireland) Repeal Act 1828 (9 Geo. 4. c. 53))
Punishment of Buggery Act 1634 (repealed)	10 Chas. 1 Sess. 2. c. 20 (I)	
An Act for the Punishment of the Vice of Buggery. (Repealed by Offences Against the Person (Ireland) Act 1829 (10 Geo. 4. c. 34))
Bigamy Act 1634 (repealed)	10 Chas. 1 Sess. 2. c. 21 (I)	
An Act for the Restraining of all persons, from Marriage, until their former Wives and former Husbands be Dead. (Repealed by Offences Against the Person (Ireland) Act 1829 (10 Geo. 4. c. 34))
Pawnbrokers Act 1634^{(Republic of Ireland)} (repealed)	10 Chas. 1 Sess. 2. c. 22 (I)	
An Act against Usury. (Repealed by Usury Laws Repeal Act 1854 (17 & 18 Vict. c. 90))
Barking of Trees Act 1634 (repealed)	10 Chas. 1 Sess. 2. c. 23 (I)	
An Act to Avoid and Prevent diverse Misdemeanours by Idle and Lewd persons, in Barking of Trees, &c. (Repealed by Criminal Statutes (Ireland) Repeal Act 1828 (9 Geo. 4. c. 53))
Sea Coast Fishing and Fishermen Relief Act 1634 (repealed)	10 Chas. 1 Sess. 2. c. 24 (I)	
An Act for the better Preservation of Fishing, in the Counties of Dublin, Wicklow, Wexford, Waterford, County Kerry, Claire, Gallway, Mayo, Sligo, and all other Counties and Places, within the Realm of Ireland and the Dominions thereof, adjoining the Sea-Coasts; and for the Relief of Balkers, Conders, and Fisher-men, against malicious Sutes. (Repealed by Fisheries (Ireland) Act 1842 (5 & 6 Vict. c. 106))
Impounding of Distresses Act 1634 (repealed)	10 Chas. 1 Sess. 2. c. 25 (I)	
An Act for the Impounding of Distresses. (Repealed by Summary Jurisdiction (Ireland) Act 1851 (14 & 15 Vict. c. 92))
Bridges, Causeways, and Highways Repair Act 1634	10 Chas. 1 Sess. 2. c. 26 (I)	
An Act concerning the Repairing and Amending of Bridges, Cawseys and Toghers in the High-ways.

=== 10 Chas. 1. Sess. 3 (1634) ===
The 3rd session of the 1st Parliament of Charles I, which met from 26 January 1635 until 18 April 1635.

This session was also traditionally cited as 10 Car. 1. Sess. 3, 10 Car. 1. Stat. 3, 10 Car. 1. St. 3, 10 Car. 1. st. 3, 10 C. 1. Sess. 3, 10 C. 1. Stat. 3, 10 C. 1. St. 3 and 10 C. 1. st. 3.

Short title, or popular name	Citation	Royal assent
Long title
Pious Uses Act 1634 (repealed)	10 Chas. 1 Sess. 3. c. 1 (I)	
An Act for the Maintenance and Execution of Pious Uses. (Repealed by Statute Law Revision (Ireland) Act 1878 (41 & 42 Vict. c. 57))
Defective Titles (Amendment) Act 1634	10 Chas. 1 Sess. 3. c. 2 (I)	
An Explanation of a Statute made in a Session of this Parliament, Intituled, "An Act for Confirmation of Letters Patents hereafter to be passed upon His Majesty's Commission of Grace, for the Remedy of defective Titles." (Note: Defective Titles Act 1634 (10 Chas. 1. c. 3 (I))) (Repealed for the Republic of Ireland by Statute Law Revision (Pre-Union Irish Statutes) Act 1962 (No. 29))
Plantation Act 1634	10 Chas. 1 Sess. 3. c. 3 (I)	
An Act for securing of the Estates of the Under-takers, Servitors, Natives and others, holding Lands, Tenements, or Hereditaments, in all and every the Plantations made by our late Sovereign Lady Queen Elizabeth, by our late most Gracious Lord King James, or the King's most Excellent Majesty that now is, in the several Counties of Waterford, Cork, Limerick, Kerry, Tipperary, Wexford, Wicklow, King's County, Queen's County, Westmeath, Leitrim, Longford, Tyrone, Armagh, Donegal, Fermanagh, Cavan, and London-Derry. (Repealed for the Republic of Ireland by Statute Law Revision (Pre-Union Irish Statutes) Act 1962 (No. 29))
Naturalization of Scots (Ireland) Act 1634 (repealed)	10 Chas. 1 Sess. 3. c. 4 (I)	
An Act for the Naturalization of all the Scottish Nation, which were Ante Nati, Born before His Majesty King James, of ever blessed Memory, his happy Access unto the Crown of England and Ireland, &c. (Repealed by Statute Law Revision (Ireland) Act 1878 (41 & 42 Vict. c. 57))
Ulster Bishops' Leases Act 1634 (repealed)	10 Chas. 1 Sess. 3. c. 5 (I)	
An Act for Confirmation of Leases made by the Lord Primate, and other Bishops in Ulster. (Repealed by Statute Law Revision (Ireland) Act 1878 (41 & 42 Vict. c. 57))
Lessees against Tenant in Tail Act 1634 (repealed)	10 Chas. 1 Sess. 3. c. 6 (I)	
An Act that Lessees shall enjoy their Farms against Tenant in Tail, or in Right of their Wives, &c. (Repealed by Statute Law Revision (Ireland) Act 1878 (41 & 42 Vict. c. 57))
Debts upon Execution Act 1634 (repealed)	10 Chas. 1 Sess. 3. c. 7 (I)	
An Act for contentation of debts upon execution. (Repealed for the Republic of Ireland by Statute Law Revision (Pre-Union Irish Statutes) Act 1962 (No. 29) and for Northern Ireland by the Statute Law Revision Act 1950 (14 Geo. 6. c. 6))
Execution Delays Act 1634 (repealed)	10 Chas. 1 Sess. 3. c. 8 (I)	
An Act to avoid unnecessary Delays of Execution. (Repealed by Statute Law Revision (Ireland) Act 1878 (41 & 42 Vict. c. 57))
Creditors Relief Act 1634 (repealed)	10 Chas. 1 Sess. 3. c. 9 (I)	
An Act for the Relief of Creditors, against such persons as dye in Execution. (Repealed by Statute Law Revision (Ireland) Act 1879 (42 & 43 Vict. c. 24))
Administration of Estates Act 1634^{(Republic of Ireland)}	10 Chas. 1 Sess. 3. c. 10 (I)	
An Act against the fraudulent Administration of Intestates Goods.
Avoiding of Recoveries by Collusion Act 1634 (repealed)	10 Chas. 1 Sess. 3. c. 11 (I)	
An Act for the Avoiding of Recoveries, suffered by Collusion by Tenants for Term of Life, and such others. (Repealed by Statute Law Revision (Ireland) Act 1878 (41 & 42 Vict. c. 57))
Secret Summons Act 1634 (repealed)	10 Chas. 1 Sess. 3. c. 12 (I)	
An Act for Avoiding of Secret Summons in real Actions. (Repealed by Statute Law Revision (Ireland) Act 1878 (41 & 42 Vict. c. 57))
Forcible Entry Act 1634^{(Republic of Ireland)}	10 Chas. 1 Sess. 3. c. 13 (I)	
An Act for Explanation of the Statute of Anno Octavo of Henry the Sixth, (Note: Forcible Entry Act 1429 (8 Hen. 6. c. 9 (Eng))) concerning Forcible Entries; and to enable certain Judges and Justices to give Restitution of Possession in certain Cases. (Repealed for Northern Ireland by Judicature (Northern Ireland) Act 1978 (c. 23))
Fisheries Protection Act 1634 (repealed)	10 Chas. 1 Sess. 3. c. 14 (I)	
An Act against the killing of young Spawn and Fry of Eeles and Salmon. (Repealed by Fisheries (Ireland) Act 1842 (5 & 6 Vict. c. 106))
Maintenance and Embracery Act 1634^{(Republic of Ireland)}	10 Chas. 1 Sess. 3. c. 15 (I)	
An Act against maintenance, embracery, &c. and against unlawful buying of titles.
Women Felons Act 1634 (repealed)	10 Chas. 1 Sess. 3. c. 16 (I)	
An Act concerning Women Convicted of finall Felonies. (Repealed by Criminal Statutes (Ireland) Repeal Act 1828 (9 Geo. 4. c. 53))
Abduction of Maidens Act 1634 (repealed)	10 Chas. 1 Sess. 3. c. 17 (I)	
An Act for the Punishment of such as shall take away Maidens that be Inheritors, being within the Age of Sixteen years, or Marry them without the Consent of their Parents. (Repealed by Offences Against the Person (Ireland) Act 1829 (10 Geo. 4. c. 34))
Sheriffs Act 1634^{(Republic of Ireland)} or the Oaths Act (Ireland) 1634^{(United Kingdom)}	10 Chas. 1 Sess. 3. c. 18 (I)	
An Act for the Swearing of Under-Sheriffs and other Offices. (Repealed for Northern Ireland by Judicature (Northern Ireland) Act 1978 (c. 23))
Sheriffs and Bailiffs Act 1634 (repealed)	10 Chas. 1 Sess. 3. c. 19 (I)	
An Act to prevent Extortions in Sheriffs, Under-Sheriffs, and Bailiffs of Franchises and Liberties, in Cases of Execution. (Repealed by Statute Law Revision (Ireland) Act 1878 (41 & 42 Vict. c. 57))
Fraudulent Fines and Recoveries Act 1634 (repealed)	10 Chas. 1 Sess. 3. c. 20 (I)	
An Act against such as shall Levy any Fine, suffer any Recovery, knowledge any Statute, Recognizance, Bail or Judgment, in the Name of any other person, not being privy and consenting thereto. (Repealed by Criminal Statutes Repeal Act 1861 (24 & 25 Vict. c. 95))
Non-Resident Nobility Act 1634 (repealed)	10 Chas. 1 Sess. 3. c. 21 (I)	
An Act whereby certain of the Nobility of Ireland dwelling within England, or elsewhere out of this Realm, are made lyable unto certain Charges within this Kingdom. (Repealed by Statute Law Revision (Ireland) Act 1878 (41 & 42 Vict. c. 57))
Bows Importation (Repeal) Act 1634 (repealed)	10 Chas. 1 Sess. 3. c. 22 (I)	
An Act to Repeal a Statute made in the Twelfth year of King Edward the Fourth, (Note: Bows Importation Act 1472 (12 Edw. 4. c. 2 (I))) concerning bringing Bows in to this Kingdom. (Repealed by Statute Law Revision (Ireland) Act 1878 (41 & 42 Vict. c. 57))
Clergy Subsidies Act 1634 (repealed)	10 Chas. 1 Sess. 3. c. 23 (I)	
An Act for the Granting of Eight Entire Subsidies by the Prelates and Clergy of Ireland. (Repealed by Statute Law Revision (Ireland) Act 1878 (41 & 42 Vict. c. 57))

=== 10 & 11 Chas. 1 (1634-35) ===
The 4th session of the 1st Parliament of Charles I.

This session was also traditionally cited as 10 & 11 Car. 1, 10 & 11 Cha. 1, 10 & 11 Car. 1 and 10 & 11 C. 1.

Short title, or popular name	Citation	Royal assent
Long title
Profane Swearing Act 1634 (repealed)	10 & 11 Chas. 1. c. 1 (I)	18 April 1635
An Act to Prevent and Reform profane Swearing and Cursing, &c. (Repealed by Statute Law Revision (Ireland) Act 1878 (41 & 42 Vict. c. 57))
Impropriations and Tythes Restitution Act 1634 (repealed)	10 & 11 Chas. 1. c. 2 (I)	18 April 1635
An Act to enable Restitution of Impropriations and Tythes, and other Rights Ecclesiastical to the Clergy, with a Restraint of Aliening the same; and Direction for Presentations to the Churches. (Repealed by Statute Law Revision (Ireland) Act 1878 (41 & 42 Vict. c. 57))
Ecclesiastical Lands Act 1634^{(Republic of Ireland)}	10 & 11 Chas. 1. c. 3 (I)	18 April 1635
An Act for the Preservation of the Inheritance, Rights and Profits, of Lands belonging to the Church, and Persons Ecclesiastical.
Rogues and Vagabonds Act 1634 (repealed)	10 & 11 Chas. 1. c. 4 (I)	18 April 1635
An Act for the Erecting of Houses of Correction, for the Punishment of Rogues, Vagabonds, Sturdy Beggers and other Lewd and Idle persons. (Repealed by Statute Law Revision (Ireland) Act 1878 (41 & 42 Vict. c. 57))
Ale-houses Act 1634	10 & 11 Chas. 1. c. 5 (I)	18 April 1635
An Act for Keepers of Ale-houses to be bound by Recognizance.
Repeal of Statutes (Ireland) Act 1634 (repealed)	10 & 11 Chas. 1. c. 6 (I)	18 April 1635
An Act for Repeal of diverse Statutes, heretofore Enacted in this Kingdom of Ireland. (Repealed by Statute Law Revision (Ireland) Act 1878 (41 & 42 Vict. c. 57))
Distress for Rent Act 1634 (repealed)	10 & 11 Chas. 1. c. 7 (I)	18 April 1635
An Act of Explanation of a Statute made in this Realm, in the Eighteenth year of the Reign of the late King Edward the Fourth, Intituled, "An Act whereby Distresses taken for Rent may be Sold." (Note: Distress for Rent Act 1478 (18 Edw. 4. c. 1 (I))) (Repealed by Landlord and Tenant Law Amendment (Ireland) Act 1860 (23 & 24 Vict. c. 154))
Defendant's Costs Act 1634 (repealed)	10 & 11 Chas. 1. c. 8 (I)	18 April 1635
An Act to give costs to the defendant, upon a nonsuite of the plaintiffe, or verdict against him. (Repealed for the Republic of Ireland by Statute Law Revision (Pre-Union Irish Statutes) Act 1962 (No. 29) and for Northern Ireland by the Statute Law Revision Act 1950 (14 Geo. 6. c. 6))
Treason and Felonies Act 1634 (repealed)	10 & 11 Chas. 1. c. 9 (I)	18 April 1635
An Act for the Limitting of Peremptory Challenges in Cases of Treason and Felonies, &c. (Repealed by Criminal Statutes (Ireland) Repeal Act 1828 (9 Geo. 4. c. 53))
Certiorari and Supersedeas Act 1634	10 & 11 Chas. 1. c. 10 (I)	18 April 1635
An Act to prevent and punish the abuses in procuring processe and supersedeas of the peace and good behaviour out of his Majesties courts of Chancery and Kings Bench and to prevent abuses in procuring writs of certiorari, &c. (Repealed for the Republic of Ireland by Statute Law Revision (Pre-Union Irish Statutes) Act 1962 (No. 29))
Common Informers Act 1634^{(Republic of Ireland)} (repealed)	10 & 11 Chas. 1. c. 11 (I)	18 April 1635
An Act for the Ease of the Subject, concerning Informations upon penal Statutes. (Repealed for Northern Ireland by Statute Law Revision Act 1959 (7 & 8 Eliz. 2. c. 68) and for the Republic of Ireland by Statute Law Revision (Pre-Union Irish Statutes) Act 1962 (No. 29))
Parliamentary Privilege (Execution) Act 1634	10 & 11 Chas. 1. c. 12 (I)	18 April 1635
An Act for new Executions to be Sued against any which hereafter shall be Delivered out of Execution, by Priviledge of Parliament. (Repealed for the Republic of Ireland by Statute Law Revision (Pre-Union Irish Statutes) Act 1962 (No. 29))
Hue and Cry Act 1634 (repealed)	10 & 11 Chas. 1. c. 13 (I)	18 April 1635
An Act for the following of Hue and Cry. (Repealed by Statute Law Revision (Ireland) Act 1878 (41 & 42 Vict. c. 57))
Attainder of Treason and Felony Act 1634 (repealed)	10 & 11 Chas. 1. c. 14 (I)	18 April 1635
An Act concerning Errors in Records of Attainder of High-Treason and Felony. (Repealed by Statute Law Revision (Ireland) Act 1878 (41 & 42 Vict. c. 57))
Cruelty to Horses and Sheep Act 1634 (repealed)	10 & 11 Chas. 1. c. 15 (I)	18 April 1635
An Act against Plowing by the Tayle, and pulling the Wooll off living Sheep. (Repealed by Criminal Statutes (Ireland) Repeal Act 1828 (9 Geo. 4. c. 53))
Supression of Cosherers Act 1634 (repealed)	10 & 11 Chas. 1. c. 16 (I)	18 April 1635
An Act for the Supressing of Cosherers and Idle Wanderers. (Repealed by Statute Law Revision (Ireland) Act 1878 (41 & 42 Vict. c. 57))
Burning of Corn Act 1634 (repealed)	10 & 11 Chas. 1. c. 17 (I)	18 April 1635
An Act to Prevent the unprofitable Custom of Burning of Corne in the Straw. (Repealed by Criminal Statutes (Ireland) Repeal Act 1828 (9 Geo. 4. c. 53))
Herriots Regulation Act 1634 (repealed)	10 & 11 Chas. 1. c. 18 (I)	18 April 1635
An Act Restraining the abusive taking and distraining for Herriots. (Repealed by Statute Law Revision (Ireland) Act 1878 (41 & 42 Vict. c. 57))
General and Free Pardon Act 1634 (repealed)	10 & 11 Chas. 1. c. 19 (I)	18 April 1635
An Act for the King's Majesty's most Gracious, General and Free Pardon. (Repealed by Statute Law Revision (Ireland) Act 1878 (41 & 42 Vict. c. 57))

=== 15 Chas. 1. Sess. 2 (1639) ===
The 2nd Parliament of Charles I, which met from 16 March 1639.

This session was also cited as 15 Car. 1, 15 Car. 1. Sess. 2, 15 Car. 1. Stat. 2, 15 Car. 1. St. 2, 15 Car. 1. st. 2, 15 C. 1, 15 C. 1. Sess. 2, 15 C. 1. Stat. 2, 15 C. 1. St. 2 and 15 C. 1. st. 2.

Short title, or popular name	Citation	Royal assent
Long title
Informations of Intrusion Act 1639	15 Chas. 1 Sess. 2. c. 1 (I)	
An Act to Admit the Subject to Plead the General Issue in Informations of Intrusion, brought on behalf of the King's Majesty, and to Retain his Possession till Tryal.
Levying Fines Act 1639 (repealed)	15 Chas. 1 Sess. 2. c. 2 (I) (Note: Also cited as 15 Car. 1. c. 2.)	
An Act for Abridging of Proclamations upon Fines, to be Levyed at the Common Law. (Repealed by Statute Law Revision (Ireland) Act 1878 (41 & 42 Vict. c. 57))
Forfeiture Act 1639^{(Republic of Ireland)} or the Forfeiture Act (Ireland) 1639^{(United Kingdom)}	15 Chas. 1 Sess. 2. c. 3 (I)	
An Act for the Relief of Patentees, Tenants, and Farmers of Crown Lands, or other Profits, or Lands within the Survey of the Court of Wards and Liveries in cases of Forfeiture for Non-payment of the Rents, or other Service or Duty.
Findings of Offices Act 1639 (repealed)	15 Chas. 1 Sess. 2. c. 4 (I) (Note: Also cited as 15 Car. 1. c. 4.)	
An Act touching the findings of Offices, before the Excheator, &c.
Writs of Error Act 1639 (repealed)	15 Chas. 1 Sess. 2. c. 5 (I) (Note: Also cited as 15 Car. 1. c. 5.)	
An Act against discontinuance of Writes of Error, in the Courts. (Repealed by Statute Law Revision (Ireland) Act 1878 (41 & 42 Vict. c. 57))
Commissions of Grace Act 1639	15 Chas. 1 Sess. 2. c. 6 (I)	
An Act for strengthening of letters patent past and to be past, upon any of his Majesties commissions of grace for the remedy of defective titles, etc. (Repealed for the Republic of Ireland by Statute Law Revision (Pre-Union Irish Statutes) Act 1962 (No. 29))
Clergy Act 1639 (repealed)	15 Chas. 1 Sess. 2. c. 7 (I)	
An Act concerning Clergy. (Repealed by Criminal Statutes (Ireland) Repeal Act 1828 (9 Geo. 4. c. 53))
Dublin Ale-houses Act 1639 (repealed)	15 Chas. 1 Sess. 2. c. 8 (I) (Note: Also cited as 15 Car. 1. c. 8.)	
An Act for Punishing of Offenders within the County of Dublin, and County of the City of Dublin, against the Act for Keepers of Ale-houses, to be bound by Recognizance. (Repealed by Statute Law Revision (Ireland) Act 1878 (41 & 42 Vict. c. 57))
Killing of Robbers Act 1639 (repealed)	15 Chas. 1 Sess. 2. c. 9 (I)	
An Act to Discharge and Free True men, from all Forfeitures for Killing such as attempt to Rob or Murder them. (Repealed by Offences Against the Person (Ireland) Act 1829 (10 Geo. 4. c. 34))
Fines and Recoveries Act 1639 (repealed)	15 Chas. 1 Sess. 2. c. 10 (I) (Note: Also cited as 15 Car. 1. c. 10.)	
An Act for Remedy of Errors and Defects in Fines and Common Recoveries, heretofore Levyed, Acknowledged and Suffered. (Repealed by Statute Law Revision (Ireland) Act 1878 (41 & 42 Vict. c. 57))
Glebe Lands Act 1639 (repealed)	15 Chas. 1 Sess. 2. c. 11 (I)	
An Act for Endowing of Churches with Glebe Lands. (Repealed by Church of Ireland Acts Repeal Act 1851 (14 & 15 Vict. c. 71))
Ecclesiastical Payments Act 1639 (repealed)	15 Chas. 1 Sess. 2. c. 12 (I) (Note: Also cited as 15 Car. 1. c. 12.)	
An Act concerning Twentieth parts, and other Sums of Money payable by persons Ecclesiastical. (Repealed by Statute Law Revision (Ireland) Act 1878 (41 & 42 Vict. c. 57))

== 1660-1669 ==
=== 14 & 15 Chas. 2 (1662) ===
The 1st session of the parliament of Charles II, which met from 8 May 1661.

This session was also traditionally cited as 13 Car. 2, 14 & 15 Cha. 2, 14 & 15 Car. 2 and 14 & 15 C. 2.

Short title, or popular name	Citation	Royal assent
Long title
Crown of Ireland Act 1662 (repealed)	14 & 15 Chas. 2. c. 1 (I) (Note: Also cited as 13 Car. 2. c. 1)	
An Act of most joyful Recognition of His Majesty's undoubted Title to the Crown of Ireland. (Repealed by Statute Law Revision (Ireland) Act 1878 (41 & 42 Vict. c. 57))
Judicial Proceedings Confirmation Act 1662 (repealed)	14 & 15 Chas. 2. c. 2 (I) (Note: Also cited as 13 Car. 2. c. 2)	
An Act for Confirmation of Judicial Proceedings. (Repealed by Statute Law Revision (Ireland) Act 1878 (41 & 42 Vict. c. 57))
Judicial Proceedings Continuance Act 1662 (repealed)	14 & 15 Chas. 2. c. 3 (I) (Note: Also cited as 13 Car. 2. c. 3)	
An Act for the continuance of Process, and Judicial Proceedings. (Repealed by Statute Law Revision (Ireland) Act 1878 (41 & 42 Vict. c. 57))
Parliament Act 1662 (repealed)	14 & 15 Chas. 2. c. 4 (I) (Note: Also cited as 13 Car. 2. c. 4)	
An Act that this Session of Parliament, shall not Determine by His Majesty's Royal Assent to this or some other Bills. (Repealed by Statute Law Revision (Ireland) Act 1878 (41 & 42 Vict. c. 57))

=== 14 & 15 Chas. 2 Sess. 2 (1662) ===
The 2nd session of the parliament of Charles II.

This session was also traditionally cited as 13 Car. 2 Sess. 2, 14 & 15 Cha. 2. Sess. 2, 14 & 15 Car. 2. Sess. 2, 14 & 15 C. 2. Sess. 2, 14 & 15 C. 2. Stat. 2, 14 & 15 C. 2. St. 2 and 14 & 15 C. 2. st. 2.

Short title, or popular name	Citation	Royal assent
Long title
Revenue Act 1662	14 & 15 Chas. 2 Sess. 2. c. 1 (I) (Note: Also cited as 13 Car. 2 sess. 2. c. 1)	
An Act for the Speedy Raising of Money for His Majesty's Service.
Parliament (No. 2) Act 1662	14 & 15 Chas. 2 Sess. 2. c. 2 (I) (Note: Also cited as 13 Car. 2 sess. 2. c. 2)	
An Act that this nor any other Sessions of Parliament shall not Determine by His Majesty's Royal Assent, to this or any other Bill or Bills to be passed in this or any other Sessions of this Parliament.

=== 14 & 15 Chas. 2 Sess. 3 (1662) ===
The 3rd session of the parliament of Charles II.

This session was also traditionally cited as 14 & 15 Cha. 2. Sess. 3, 14 & 15 Car. 2. Sess. 3, 14 & 15 C. 2. Sess. 3, 14 & 15 C. 2. Stat. 3, 14 & 15 C. 2. St. 3 and 14 & 15 C. 2. st. 3.

Short title, or popular name	Citation	Royal assent
Long title
Revenue (No. 2) Act 1662 (repealed)	14 & 15 Chas. 2 Sess. 3. c. 1 (I)	
An Act for the Continuance of Customs, Excise, and New Impost, to the Five and Twentieth day of March next. (Repealed by Statute Law Revision (Ireland) Act 1878 (41 & 42 Vict. c. 57))

=== 14 & 15 Chas. 2 Sess. 4 (1662) ===
The 4th session of the parliament of Charles II.

This session was also traditionally cited as 14 & 15 Cha. 2. Sess. 4, 14 & 15 Car. 2. Sess. 4, 14 & 15 C. 2. Sess. 4, 14 & 15 C. 2. Stat. 4, 14 & 15 C. 2. St. 4 and 14 & 15 C. 2. st. 4.

Short title, or popular name	Citation	Royal assent
Long title
Observance of 29th May Act 1662 (repealed)	14 & 15 Chas. 2 Sess. 4. c. 1 (I)	
An Act for a Perpetual Anniversary Thanksgiving, on the Nine and Twentieth day of May, in this Kingdom. (Repealed by Anniversary Days Observance Act 1859)
Act of Settlement 1662 (repealed)	14 & 15 Chas. 2 Sess. 4. c. 2 (I)	
An Act for the better Execution of His Majesty's Gracious Declaration, for the Settlement of His Kingdom of Ireland, and Satisfaction of the several Interests of Adventurers Soldiers and other His Subjects there. (Repealed by Roman Catholic Relief Act 1829 (10 Geo. 4. c. 7) and for the Republic of Ireland by Statute Law Revision (Pre-Union Irish Statutes) Act 1962 (No. 29))
Hostlers and Innkeepers Act 1662	14 & 15 Chas. 2 Sess. 4. c. 3 (I)	
An Act for making all Hostelers, Inholders and others answerable for such Horses, Geldings or Mares, as the shall take upon them the Charge and Keeping of, in Stables or Out-grounds.
Eustace's Estate Act 1662	14 & 15 Chas. 2 Sess. 4. c. 4 (I)	
An Act for securing Sir Maurice Eustance, Kt. in his Lands and Inheritances, and Leases for years.
Desminiers and Others Naturalization Act 1662	14 & 15 Chas. 2 Sess. 4. c. 5 (I)	
An Act for the Naturalizing of Lewis Desminiers, Merchants, Lerrick Westenra, Peter Westenra, Merchant Son to the said Derrick, Warner Westenra, Merchant, Albert Grasion, Merchant, William Hailet, and John Griel.
Temporality Subsidies Act 1662 (repealed)	14 & 15 Chas. 2 Sess. 4. c. 6 (I)	
An Act for the grant of Four entire Subsidies by the Temporality. (Repealed by Statute Law Revision (Ireland) Act 1878 (41 & 42 Vict. c. 57))
Further Temporality Subsidies Act 1662 (repealed)	14 & 15 Chas. 2 Sess. 4. c. 7 (I)	
An Act for the grant of Eight entire Subsidies by the Temporality. (Repealed by Statute Law Revision (Ireland) Act 1878 (41 & 42 Vict. c. 57))
Excise and New Impost Act 1662 (repealed)	14 & 15 Chas. 2 Sess. 4. c. 8 (I)	
An Act for the Settling of the Excise or New Impost upon His Majesty, His Heirs and Successors, according to the Book of Rates therein Incerted. (Repealed by Statute Law Revision (Ireland) Act 1878 (41 & 42 Vict. c. 57))
Customs Act 1662^{(Republic of Ireland)}	14 & 15 Chas. 2 Sess. 4. c. 9 (I)	
An Act for Settling the Subsidy of Poundage, and Granting a Subsidy of Tunnage, and other Sums of Money unto His Royal Majesty, His Heirs and Successors the same to be paid upon Merchandise, Imported and Exported into or out of the Kingdom of Ireland, according to the Book of Rates hereunto Annexed.
Parishes and Free Schools Act 1662	14 & 15 Chas. 2 Sess. 4. c. 10 (I)	
An Act for real union and division of parishes, and concerning churches, free-schools and exchanges. (Repealed for the Republic of Ireland by Statute Law Revision (Pre-Union Irish Statutes) Act 1962 (No. 29))
Customs, Excise and New-Impost Act 1662 (repealed)	14 & 15 Chas. 2 Sess. 4. c. 11 (I)	
An Act for the Customs, Excise and New-Impost, to be continued until the Four and Twentieth day of September, One thousand six hundred sixty and two. (Repealed by Statute Law Revision (Ireland) Act 1878 (41 & 42 Vict. c. 57))
Ireland Settlement Act 1662	14 & 15 Chas. 2 Sess. 4. c. 12 (I)	
An Act for the Inlargement of the Periods of time Limitted in an Act (Note: Act of Settlement 1662 (14 & 15 Chas. 2 Sess. 4. c. 2 (I))) for the better Execution of His Majesty's Gracious Declaration, for the Settlement of his Kingdom of Ireland, &c.
Protestant Strangers Act 1662 (repealed)	14 & 15 Chas. 2 Sess. 4. c. 13 (I)	
An Act for Encouraging Protestant Strangers and others, to Inhabit and Plant in the Kingdom of Ireland. (Repealed by Naturalization Act 1870 (33 & 34 Vict. c. 14))
Massey's Estate Act 1662	14 & 15 Chas. 2 Sess. 4. c. 14 (I)	
An Act for securing Sir Edward Massey, Kt. the Mannor and Abby of Leix, for Ninety nine years.
Parliament (No. 3) Act 1662 (repealed)	14 & 15 Chas. 2 Sess. 4. c. 15 (I)	
An Act that this Session of Parliament, shall not Determine by His Majesties Royal Assent, to this or any other Bills, to be passed in this or any other Session in this Parliament. (Repealed by Statute Law Revision (Ireland) Act 1878 (41 & 42 Vict. c. 57))
Duke of Ormonde's Grant Act 1662	14 & 15 Chas. 2 Sess. 4. c. 16 (I)	
An Act for Raising Thirty Thousand pounds for the use of James Duke of Ormonde.
Additional Revenue Act 1662 (repealed)	14 & 15 Chas. 2 Sess. 4. c. 17 (I)	
An Act for Establishing an Additional Revenue upon His Majesty, His Heirs and Successors, for the better Support of His and their Crown and Dignity. (Repealed by Statute Law Revision (Ireland) Act 1878 (41 & 42 Vict. c. 57))
Ale and Beer Retail Licences Act 1662 (repealed)	14 & 15 Chas. 2 Sess. 4. c. 18 (I)	
An Act for the Improvement of His Majesty's Revenues, upon the Granting of Licences for Selling of Ale and Beer. (Repealed by Statute Law Revision (Ireland) Act 1878 (41 & 42 Vict. c. 57))
Tenures Abolition Act 1662^{(Republic of Ireland)}	14 & 15 Chas. 2 Sess. 4. c. 19 (I)	
An Act for taking away the Court of Wards and Liveries, and Tenures in Captite, and by Knights Service.
Duke of Ormonde's Letters Patent Act 1662	14 & 15 Chas. 2 Sess. 4. c. 20 (I)	
An Act for Confirmation of Letters Patents, Granted by His Majesty, to his Grace James Duke of Ormonde.
Lord Chancellor's Seal Fee Act 1662 (repealed)	14 & 15 Chas. 2 Sess. 4. c. 21 (I)	
An Act for increasing the fee of the seal due to the lord chancellor of Ireland. (Repealed for the Republic of Ireland by Statute Law Revision (Pre-Union Irish Statutes) Act 1962 (No. 29) and for Northern Ireland by the Statute Law Revision Act 1950 (14 Geo. 6. c. 6))
Supply Act 1662 (repealed)	14 & 15 Chas. 2 Sess. 4. c. 22 (I)	
An Act for the Raising of 23500 pounds Sterling, for the several uses therein Expressed. (Repealed by Statute Law Revision (Ireland) Act 1878 (41 & 42 Vict. c. 57))
Observance of 23rd October Act 1662 (repealed)	14 & 15 Chas. 2 Sess. 4. c. 23 (I)	
An Act for Keeping and Celebrating the 23d of October, as an Anniversary Thanksgiving in this Kingdom. (Repealed by Anniversary Days Observance Act 1859)
Clergy Subsidies Act 1662 (repealed)	14 & 15 Chas. 2 Sess. 4. c. 24 (I)	
An Act for the granting of Eight Subsidies by the Prelats and Clergy of Ireland. (Repealed by Statute Law Revision (Ireland) Act 1878 (41 & 42 Vict. c. 57))

=== 17 & 18 Chas. 2 (1665) ===
The 5th session of the parliament of Charles II.

This session was also traditionally cited as 17 & 17 Cha. 2, 17 & 18 Car. 2 and 17 & 18 C. 2.

Short title, or popular name	Citation	Royal assent
Long title
Subsidy Act 1665 (repealed)	17 & 18 Chas. 2. c. 1 (I)	
An Act for the Granting of Eight entire Subsidies, by the Temporality. (Repealed by Statute Law Revision (Ireland) Act 1878 (41 & 42 Vict. c. 57))
Act of Explanation 1665	17 & 18 Chas. 2. c. 2 (I)	
An Act for the Explaning of some Doubts, Arising upon an Act Intituled, "An Act for the better Execution of His Majesty's Gracious Declaration, for the Settlement of His Kingdom of Ireland, and Satisfaction of the several Interests of Adventurers Soldiers and other His Subjects;" (Note: Act of Settlement 1662 (14 & 15 Chas. 2 Sess. 4. c. 2 (I))) and for making some Alterations of, and Additions unto the said Act, for the more Speedy and Effectual Settlement of the said Kingdom. (Repealed for the Republic of Ireland by Statute Law Revision (Pre-Union Irish Statutes) Act 1962 (No. 29))
Marriage Act 1665 (repealed)	17 & 18 Chas. 2. c. 3 (I)	
An Act for the Confirmation of Marriages. (Repealed by Statute Law Revision (Ireland) Act 1878 (41 & 42 Vict. c. 57))
Domvile's Estate Act 1665	17 & 18 Chas. 2. c. 4 (I)	
An At for the Vesting and Settling upon Sir William Domvile, Kt. His Majesty's Attorney General of Ireland, his Heirs and Assigns for ever, a parcel of Land part of the Possessions belonging to the Canons of St. Patrick, Dublin, upon an Agreement with the Dean and Chapter thereof, paying thereunto a certain yearly Rent.
Duke of Albemarle's Estate Act 1665	17 & 18 Chas. 2. c. 5 (I)	
An Act for the Securing several Lands, Tenements and Hereditaments unto George Duke of Albemarle.
Act of Uniformity 1665 (repealed)	17 & 18 Chas. 2. c. 6 (I)	
An Act for the Uniformity of Publique Prayers and Administration of Sacraments, and other Rites and Ceremonies; and for establishing the Forme of making, ordaining, and consecrating Bishops, Priests and Deacons, in the Church of Ireland. (Repealed for the Republic of Ireland by Statute Law Revision (Pre-Union Irish Statutes) Act 1962 (No. 29) and for Northern Ireland by the Statute Law Revision Act 1950 (14 Geo. 6. c. 6))
Ministers Provision and St. Andrews Church Act 1665	17 & 18 Chas. 2. c. 7 (I)	
An Act for provision of Ministers in Cities and Corporate Towns, and making the Church of St. Andrews in the Suburbs of the City of Dublin Presentative for ever.
Poor Prisoners Relief Act 1666 (repealed)	17 & 18 Chas. 2. c. 8 (I)	
An Act for the Relief of poor Prisoners. (Repealed by Prisons (Ireland) Act 1810 (50 Geo. 3. c. 103))
Linen Act 1665	17 & 18 Chas. 2. c. 9 (I)	
An Act for the advancement of the Trade of Linnen Manufacture.
Plurality of Benefices Act 1665 (repealed)	17 & 18 Chas. 2. c. 10 (I)	
An Act for disabling Spiritual persons from holding Benefices, or other Ecclesiastical Dignities, in England or Wales, and in Ireland at the same time. (Repealed by Statute Law Revision (Ireland) Act 1878 (41 & 42 Vict. c. 57))
Judgments and Recognizances Act 1665 (repealed)	17 & 18 Chas. 2. c. 11 (I)	
An Act to prevent Delays in extending Statutes, Judgements and Recognizances. (Repealed for the Republic of Ireland by Statute Law Revision (Pre-Union Irish Statutes) Act 1962 (No. 29) and for Northern Ireland by the Statute Law Revision Act 1950 (14 Geo. 6. c. 6))
Judgments and Executions Act 1665 (repealed)	17 & 18 Chas. 2. c. 12 (I)	
An Act to prevent Arrests of Judgment, and Superceeding Executions. (Repealed by Statute Law Revision (Ireland) Act 1878 (41 & 42 Vict. c. 57))
Tithes and Mortuaries Act 1665 (repealed)	17 & 18 Chas. 2. c. 13 (I)	
An Act concerning Tythings, Oblations and Mortuaries. (Repealed by Statute Law Revision (Ireland) Act 1878 (41 & 42 Vict. c. 57))
St. Patrick's Cathedral Estate Act 1665	17 & 18 Chas. 2. c. 14 (I)	
An Act for Enabling the Precenter and Treasurer of the Cathedral Church of St. Patrick's, Dublin, and the Arch-Deacon of Dublin, to make Leases of part of their Yards and Gardens for Sixty Years.
Alnage and Drapery Act 1665	17 & 18 Chas. 2. c. 15 (I)	
An Act for the true making of all sorts of Cloth called the old Drapery, and the true Searching and Sealing thereof, by his Majesty's Alnager within this Kingdom.
Cappequin Bridge Act 1665	17 & 18 Chas. 2. c. 16 (I)	
An Act for the building of a Bridge over the River of Black-water at Cappequin in the County of Waterford.
Subsidy (No. 2) Act 1665 (repealed)	17 & 18 Chas. 2. c. 17 (I)	
An Act for Granting of four Subsidies by the Temporality of this his Majesty's Kingdom. (Repealed by Statute Law Revision (Ireland) Act 1878 (41 & 42 Vict. c. 57))
Hearth Money Act 1665 (repealed)	17 & 18 Chas. 2. c. 18 (I)	
An Additional Act for the better Ordering and Collecting the Revenue arising by Hearth-Money. (Repealed by Statute Law Revision (Ireland) Act 1878 (41 & 42 Vict. c. 57))
Wines and Strong Waters Retail Act 1665 (repealed)	17 & 18 Chas. 2. c. 19 (I)	
An Act for the better ordering the Selling of Wines and Aqua vitae, together with all sorts of Strong Waters by Retail. (Repealed by Statute Law Revision (Ireland) Act 1878 (41 & 42 Vict. c. 57))
Dublin Nisi Prius Trials Act 1665 (repealed)	17 & 18 Chas. 2. c. 20 (I)	
An Act for the trial by Nisi Prius of Issues laid in the City of Dublin and County of Dublin. (Repealed for the Republic of Ireland by Statute Law Revision (Pre-Union Irish Statutes) Act 1962 (No. 29))
St. Patrick's Cathedral Act 1665	17 & 18 Chas. 2. c. 21 (I)	
An additional Act to the Act Intituled, "An Act for the cleansing of the Water-course in St. Patrick's Street." (Note: Dublin Watercourse Act 1492 (8 Hen. 7. c. 1 (I)))
Dungan's Naturalization Act 1665	17 & 18 Chas. 2. c. 22 (I)	
An Act for the Naturalization of Maria Euphemia Dungan, Walter Dungan, Esq; Ursula Dungan, Judith Cox, alias Keating, and Charlott Lane, Daughter to Sir George Lane, Knight.
Meredith's Estate Act 1665	17 & 18 Chas. 2. c. 23 (I)	
An Act for Settling the Abbey of St. John's, in or near Atby, upon Dame Mary Meredith, and her Heirs for ever.

==== Sources ====
- "The seventeenth and eighteenth Years of Charles II". Statutes Passed in the Parliaments Held in Ireland. Vol. II: From the Seventeenth and Eighteenth Years of Charles the Second, A.D. 1665, to the Eleventh Year of Anne, A.D. 1712, inclusive. Dublin: George Grierson. 1794. pp. 1–199 – via Google Books.

== See also ==
- List of acts of the Parliament of Ireland
- List of acts of the Oireachtas
- List of legislation in the United Kingdom
