= An Act against Plowing by the Tayle, and pulling the Wooll off living Sheep =

Act of the Parliament of Ireland

Cruelty to Horses and Sheep Act 1634
- Act of Parliament
- Parliament of Ireland
- Long title: An Act against Plowing by the Tayle, and pulling the Wooll off living Sheep.
- Citation: 10 & 11 Chas. 1. c. 15 (I)
- Territorial extent: Ireland

Dates
- Royal assent: 18 April 1635
- Commencement: 26 January 1635 (Note: Start of session.)
- Repealed: 31 August 1828

Other legislation
- Repealed by: Criminal Statutes (Ireland) Repeal Act 1828

Status: Repealed

Text of statute as originally enacted

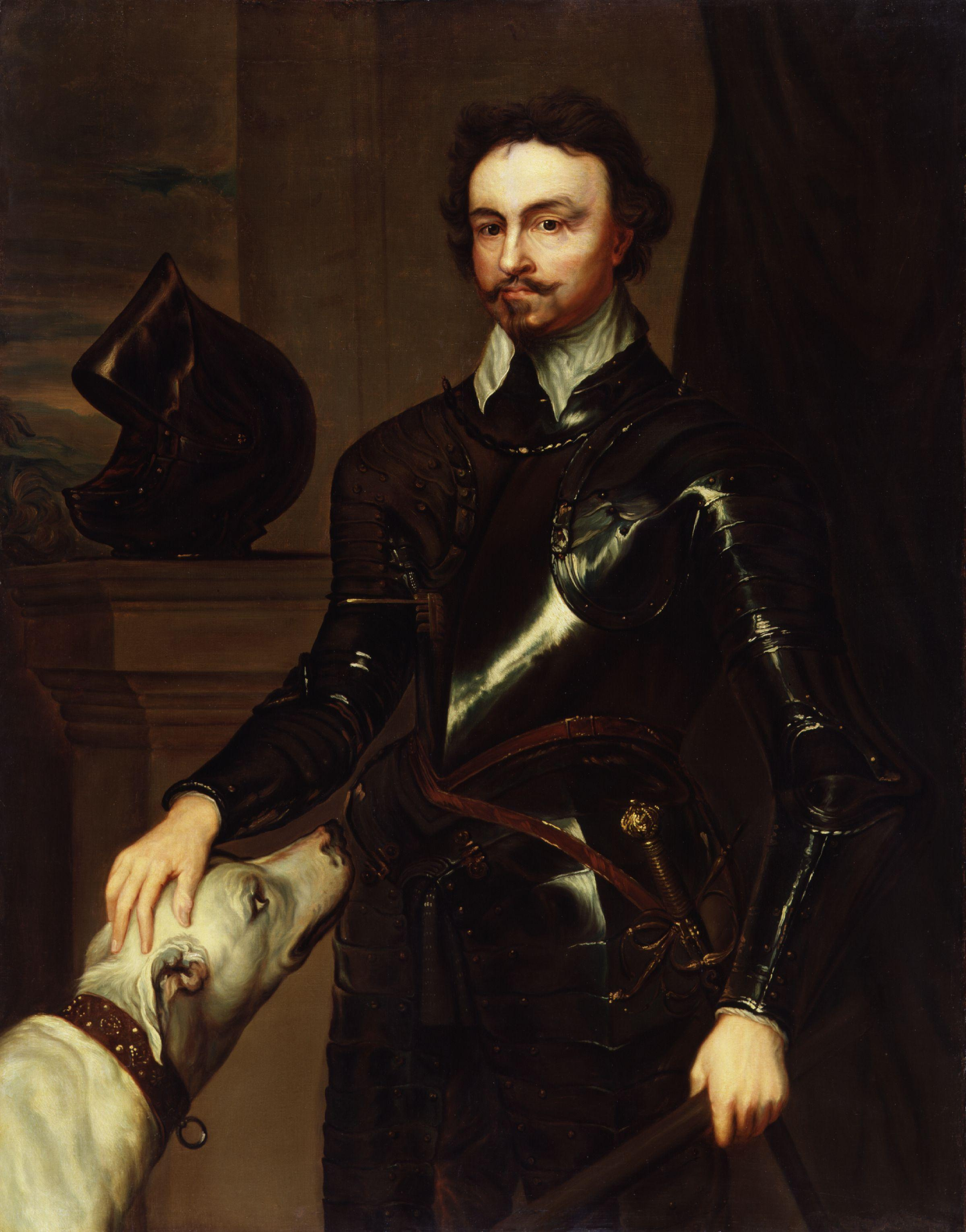
Thomas Wentworth, 1st Earl of Strafford, who as Lord Deputy of Ireland initiated the act

The Cruelty to Horses and Sheep Act 1634 (10 & 11 Chas. 1. c. 15 (I)) or An Act against Plowing by the Tayle, and pulling the Wooll off living Sheep was an act of the Parliament of Ireland passed in 1635. It was one of the first pieces of legislation to protect the rights of animals, although previous decrees and laws had been enacted as early as the 3rd century BCE in India. The act was one of several proposed to deal with what the Protestant Ascendancy viewed as the barbarous practices of the Gaelic Irish. The committee for preparing acts (under Poynings' Law) on 26 July 1634 ordered the Attorney General and Solicitor-General to "make a draught of one or more Acts to be passed for restraining the barbaric custom of plowing by the tail, of pulling the wool off living sheep, of burning corn in the straw, of barking of standing trees, of cutting young trees by stealth, of forcing cows to give milk, and of building houses without chimneys". One other act arose from this order: "An Act to Prevent the unprofitable Custom of Burning of Corne in the Straw", the Burning of Corn Act 1634 (10 & 11 Chas. 1. c. 17 (I)).

== Ploughing by the tail ==
Especially in Ulster, the practice was to attach a short plough to a horse's tail. The simple plough was cheaper than one attached with a harness. The horse would stop in pain when the plough hit a rock, which made rocks less likely to damage the plough. In 1606, an order in council prohibited the practice, with a fine of a garron. (The order was by royal prerogative: an "act of state" rather than an "act of Parliament".) The order was not enforced, and in 1612 Arthur Chichester, the Lord Deputy, mandated instead a fine of 10 shillings, selling a monopoly patent for £100 per year to Sir William Udale to collect the fines. Udale earned £870 the first year. Administrators complained that Udale was charging only 2s6d, so that the fine served as a fee rather than a deterrent. In 1614 the Dublin Castle administration suggested the fines should be used to pay for better ploughs, or replaced with corporal punishment. Nevertheless, Udale's patent was renewed in 1623. Several petitioners from Ulster asked for the order's revocation.

== Pulling of wool ==
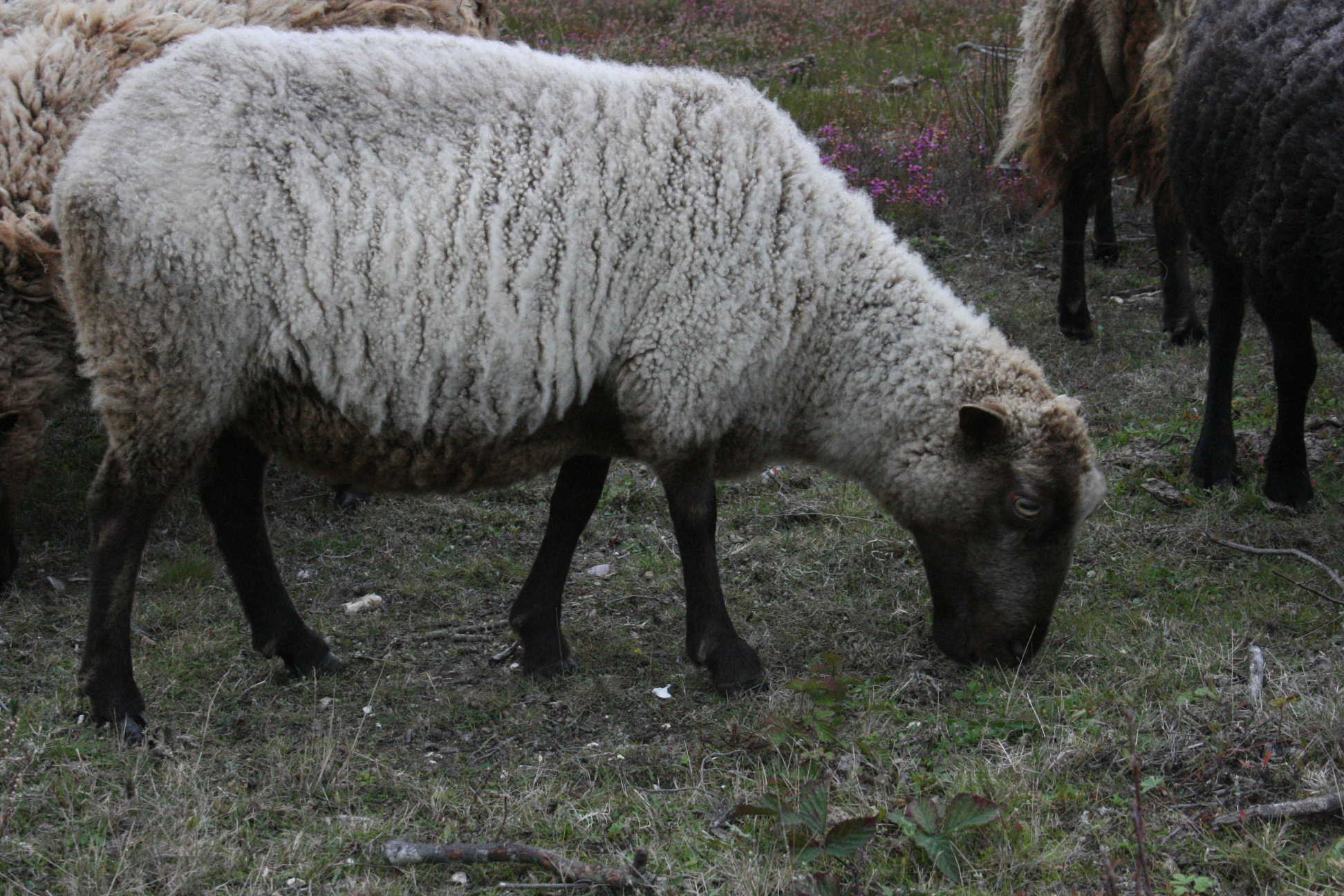
A Northern European short-tailed sheep of the type formerly common in Ireland. They moult in summer, and wool can be plucked instead of being sheared.

Irish farmers bred sheep whose wool could plucked or torn off their sheep by hand in the summer, rather than having to shear them with expensive shears. While there is no record of how frequently this practice occurred, it was apparently considered cruel enough to criminalize. In any case, the act "was the first act that criminalised certain practices on the grounds of animal cruelty."

== Enforcement and repeal ==
A bill to suspend the 1635 act for ten years was transmitted and approved by Charles I in 1641, but never enacted as the 1641 Rebellion began a period of disruption. The 1635 act's repeal was demanded in 1646 by the Confederates in negotiations with Lord Deputy Ormonde. It was finally repealed in 1828 by one of Peel's Acts for restating and consolidating laws, the Criminal Statutes (Ireland) Repeal Act 1828 (9 Geo. 4. c. 53). British Whig writers of the 1830s alleged that ploughing by the tail was still practised in the West of Ireland at that time. Such claims were denied by Irish nationalists as propaganda.

== See also ==
- Agriculture law

== Bibliography ==
Primary

- Statutes Passed in the Parliaments Held in Ireland. Vol. 1: 1310-1662. George Grierson. 1794. pp. 301–302, 304–305.
- The Journals of the House of Commons of the Kingdom of Ireland [JHCI] (PDF). Vol. 1. 1753.
- Report of Commissioners: Patent Roll, 16 James I. part iii. f.; reprinted in Jervis-White-Jervis, Henry (1868). "The Rebellion of 1641". Ireland Under British Rule. Chapman and Hall. p. 160, fn.1.

Secondary

- Bagwell, Richard (1909). Ireland under the Stuarts and during the interregnum. Vol. 1: 1603–1642. London: Longmans, Green. pp. 124–125.
- Beirne, Piers (16 July 2009). "Against cruelty? Understanding the Act Against Plowing by the Tayle (Ireland, 1635)". Confronting Animal Abuse: Law, Criminology, and Human-Animal Relationships. Rowman & Littlefield Publishers. pp. 21–68. ISBN 9780742599741.
- Blenkinsop, Adam; Gregory, William Henry (1847). Paddiana: Or, Scraps and Sketches of Irish Life, Present and Past. R. Bentley. pp. 245–251.
- Ferguson, James F. (August 1855). "The "Short Ploughs" of the North of Ireland". The Gentleman's Magazine and Historical Review. Bradbury, Evans: 136–140.
- Philp, Robert Kemp (1866). The History of Progress in Great Britain. London: Houlston and Wright. pp. 88–90. ISBN 9781445531168.
- Pinkerton, W. (1858). "Ploughing by the Horse's Tail". Ulster Journal of Archaeology. First Series, Vol. 6: 212–221. JSTOR 20608875.
