= Statute Law Revision Act 1983 =

Act of the Oireachtas No. 11 of 1983

Oireachtas
- Long title: AN ACT TO PROMOTE THE REVISION OF THE STATUTE LAW BY REPEALING ENACTMENTS WHICH HAVE CEASED TO BE IN FORCE OR HAVE BECOME UNNECESSARY.
- Citation: No. 11 of 1983
- Enacted by: Dáil Éireann
- Signed: 16 May 1983
- Commenced: 16 May 1983
- Status: Current legislation

The Statute Law Revision Act 1983 (No 11) is an act of the Oireachtas.

Section 1 of the act, with the schedule, repeals, for Ireland, various Acts of the Parliament of Ireland, the Parliament of England, the Parliament of Great Britain and the Parliament of the United Kingdom. Among these were the British version of the Act of Union 1800: the Irish version had been repealed in the Statute Law Revision (Pre-Union Irish Statutes) Act 1962. Irish, British and UK Catholic Relief Acts associated with Catholic emancipation were also repealed.

This act has not been amended.

== See also ==
- Statute Law Revision Act
