= Settlement of Laois and Offaly Act 1556 =

Irish Act creating County Laois and County Offaly

Counties of Leix and Offaly Act 1556
- Act of Parliament
- Parliament of Ireland
- Long title: An act for the disposition of Leix and Offaily.
- Citation: 3 & 4 Phil. & Mar. c. 1 (I)
- Territorial extent: Kingdom of Ireland

Dates
- Royal assent: 1556
- Commencement: 1556
- Repealed: 8 May 2007

Other legislation
- Repealed by: Statute Law Revision Act 2007
- Relates to: Settlement of Laois and Offaly Act 1556

Status: Repealed

Text of statute as originally enacted

Settlement of Laois and Offaly Act 1556
- Act of Parliament
- Parliament of Ireland
- Long title: An Act whereby the King and Queen's Majesties, and the Heires and Successors of the Queen, be entituled to the Counties of Leix, Slewmarge, Irry, Glinmaliry, and Offaily, and for making the same Countries Shire Grounds.
- Citation: 3 & 4 Phil. & Mar. c. 2 (I)
- Territorial extent: Kingdom of Ireland

Dates
- Royal assent: 1556
- Commencement: 1556
- Repealed: 24 November 1962

Other legislation
- Repealed by: Statute Law Revision (Pre-Union Irish Statutes) Act 1962
- Relates to: Counties of Leix and Offaly Act 1556

Status: Repealed

Text of statute as originally enacted

The Settlement of Laois and Offaly Act 1556 (3 & 4 Phil. & Mar. c. 2 (I)) was an act of the Parliament of Ireland passed in 1556 which resulted in the creation of Queen's County and King's County in the midlands of Ireland, and the establishment of two shire towns at Maryborough (Portlaoise) and Philipstown (Daingean), named in honour of Queen Mary I and King Phillip II. The act was the first Tudor attempt at plantation in Ireland and was designed to formally open up the area to English settlement.

The act displaced the ruling O'More (or Moore) clan of Loígis and the O'Connor rulers of the Kingdom of Uí Failghe by declaring their lands to be the legal possession of the English monarch. In 1922, Queen's County was renamed Laois and King's County was renamed Offaly. The act was repealed by the Oireachtas in 1962.
