= Crown of Ireland Act 1542 =

Act of the Parliament of Ireland

Crown of Ireland Act 1542 (Note: Short title as conferred in Northern Ireland by the Short Titles Act (Northern Ireland) 1951; the act lacks a short title in the Republic of Ireland.)
- Act of Parliament
- Parliament of Ireland
- Long title: An Act that the King of England, his Heirs and Successors, be Kings of Ireland.
- Citation: 33 Hen. 8. c. 1 (I)
- Territorial extent: Kingdom of Ireland (1542–1800); United Kingdom (1801–1922); Northern Ireland (1922–present); Irish Free State (1922–1937)

Dates
- Royal assent: 1542
- Commencement: 18 June 1541 or 1542
- Repealed: Republic of Ireland: 24 November 1962
Other legislation
Amended by	Statute Law Revision Act 1950; Crime and Disorder Act 1998
Repealed by	Republic of Ireland: Statute Law Revision (Pre-Union Irish Statutes) Act, 1962

Status
- Republic of Ireland: Repealed
- Northern Ireland: Amended

Text of statute as originally enacted

Revised text of statute as amended

Text of the Crown of Ireland Act 1542 as in force today (including any amendments) within the United Kingdom, from legislation.gov.uk.

The Crown of Ireland Act 1542 (33 Hen. 8. c. 1 (I)) is an act of the Parliament of Ireland, which created the title of "King of Ireland" for monarchs of England and their successors; previous monarchs had ruled Ireland as Lords of Ireland. The first monarch to hold the title was King Henry VIII of England.

The long title of the act was "An Act that the King of England, his Heirs and Successors, be Kings of Ireland". Among the 18th-century Irish Patriot Party it was called the Act of Annexation.

== Background ==
The pope in 1171 abolished the High Kingship of Ireland (of 9th-century origin, successor to the Kingship of Tara) and devalued the ancient Kingdoms of Ireland.

Under Laudabiliter, a papal bull, the ancient realm was disestablished and turned into a feudal province of the Holy See of the Roman Catholic Church under the temporal power of the monarch of England who henceforth held the title Lord of Ireland, relinquishing to the papacy the annual tribute levied upon the nobility and people of Ireland.

The act was passed in the Parliament of Ireland, meeting in Dublin, on 18 June 1541 or 1542, being read out to parliament in English and Irish, and in the upper house in Irish only.

== Further developments in the 16th century ==
The secession of various European rulers during the Protestant Reformation, including Henry VIII, prompted the papacy to initiate the Counter-Reformation. Consequently, the title "King of Ireland" was not initially recognised by Europe's Catholic monarchs and the papacy. Instead, they remained committed in considering Ireland a feudal fief of the papacy, to be granted to any Catholic sovereign who managed to secure the island Kingdom from the control of its Protestant monarchs.

After the death of Henry VIII's only legitimate son, Edward VI and the deposition of his successor Jane, the throne passed to Henry's Catholic daughter, Mary I. Mary then married Philip of Spain, who was also Catholic. She restored papal authority in both England and Ireland. However, the status of Ireland as a kingdom remained in question: would the papacy recognise Ireland's existence as a kingdom in its own right or maintain some fiction of temporal papal power in the land? To rectify this, Pope Paul IV issued a papal bull in 1555, Ilius, per quem Reges regnant, recognising Philip and Mary as King and Queen of England and its dominions including Ireland. Although this did not explicitly recognise Ireland as a kingdom, it represents the surrender of most of the papacy's declared authority over Ireland, elevating it from a mere province of the Holy See to one that united the crowns of Ireland and England.

Mary died childless in 1558, and the thrones of England and Ireland passed to her half-sister, Elizabeth I, who was a Protestant. Once again, both Kingdoms were removed from papal authority. In reply, Pope Pius V issued a papal bull in 1570, Regnans in Excelsis, declaring "Elizabeth, the pretended Queen of England and the servant of crime" to be a heretic and releasing all her subjects from any allegiance to her and excommunicating any that obeyed her orders.

== Subsequent developments ==
Over the course of the next two centuries, the papacy and Europe's Catholic rulers continued to recognise Ireland as a kingdom in its own right, whilst at the same time asserting its Protestant monarchy as illegitimate. Simultaneously, they would incite Catholic rebellion to Protestants in the island as a means of recovering Ireland to a Catholic sovereign, preceding the establishment of a Catholic sovereign on the English and Scottish thrones. In reply, British diplomacy concentrated on receiving the recognition of the sovereignty of Ireland from Catholic Europe in the hope of thereby ending future Catholic sovereign incitements of the larger Catholic peasantry and securing the western flank of Great Britain from Catholic invasion.

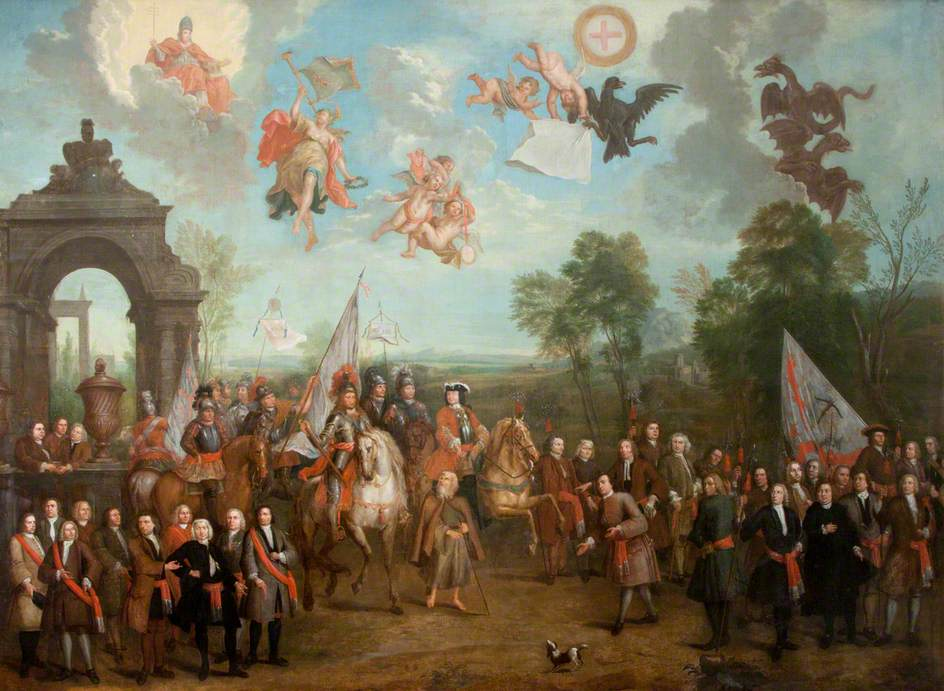
William III of England, the Duke of Schomberg and Pope Innocent XI

Until 1801, Ireland continued to exist as a Kingdom in its own right, with its own Parliament. The government of Ireland, however, remained exclusively Protestant, even after Grattan's constitution came into effect in the 1780s. Most of the country's population remained Catholic, but its Protestant minority remained socially, politically, and economically dominant; and even many Protestants were excluded from power as not being members of the established Church of Ireland. The Penal Laws preserving the position of the Protestant Ascendancy began to be dismantled in the 1780s and 1790s. However, fear of revolutionary violence in the wake of the French Revolution and the French Revolutionary Wars and subsequent republican Irish Rebellion of 1798 led the British government to seek the union of Ireland with Great Britain; this resulted in the formation of the United Kingdom of Great Britain and Ireland.

In section 2 of the act the words " And be it enacted by authority aforesaid, That on this side the first day of July next coming proclamation shall be made in all Shires within this land of Ireland of the tenour and sentences of this Act " and the words " after the said first day of July " were repealed by section 1(1) of, and the first schedule to, the Statute Law Revision Act 1950 (14 Geo. 6. c. 6), which came into force on 23 May 1950.

== The 20th century ==
As a result of the Anglo-Irish Treaty that ended the Irish War of Independence, most of Ireland officially left the United Kingdom in December 1922 and became the Irish Free State, a mostly self-governing dominion that still retained the British monarch as its sovereign and head of state. Northern Ireland, having been partitioned from what would become the Irish Free State by the Government of Ireland Act 1920, remained in the United Kingdom, with its own parliament and devolved system of government. Despite these fundamental changes, the 16th-century act remained unamended on the statute books.

From a British perspective, the Irish Free State became legislatively independent with the passage in the British Parliament of the Statute of Westminster 1931. However, the Irish Free State considered itself legislatively independent before its passage and did not recognise its legal situation as having changed. The dominion thereafter shared the person of its monarch with the United Kingdom and the other dominions of the then-called British Commonwealth.

The Irish Free State adopted a new constitution in 1937 with a president, while the Irish monarchy, which had been retained for external relations, was abolished in Irish law by The Republic of Ireland Act 1948, which became law in April 1949. Though no longer effective, the Tudor act remained on the Republic of Ireland's statute books until formally repealed in 1962.

== See also ==
- Protestant Ascendancy
- Style of the British Sovereign
- High treason in the United Kingdom
- Treason Act
