= List of acts of the Parliament of Ireland, 1500–1599 =

This is a list of acts of the Parliament of Ireland for the years from 1500 to 1599.

The number shown by each act's title is its chapter number. Acts are cited using this number, preceded by the years of the reign during which the relevant parliamentary session was held; thus the act concerning assay passed in 1783 is cited as "23 & 24 Geo. 3 c. 23", meaning the 23rd act passed during the session that started in the 23rd year of the reign of George III and which finished in the 24th year of that reign. Note that the modern convention is to use Arabic numerals in citations (thus "40 Geo. 3" rather than "40 Geo. III"). Acts of the reign of Elizabeth I are formally cited without a regnal numeral in the Republic of Ireland.

Acts passed by the Parliament of Ireland did not have a short title; however, some of these acts have subsequently been given a short title by acts of the Parliament of the United Kingdom, acts of the Parliament of Northern Ireland, or acts of the Oireachtas. This means that some acts have different short titles in the Republic of Ireland and Northern Ireland respectively. Official short titles are indicated by the flags of the respective jurisdictions.

A number of the acts included in this list are still in force in Northern Ireland or the Republic of Ireland. Because these two jurisdictions are entirely separate, the version of an act in force in one may differ from the version in force in the other; similarly, an act may have been repealed in one but not in the other.

A number of acts passed by the Parliament of England also extended to Ireland during this period.

== 7 Hen. 8 (1515) ==
This session was also traditionally cited as 7 H. 8.

- c. 1 Privy Seal Act (Ireland) 1515 An Act against such as sue letters under the privie seal out of England. — repealed by Statute Law Revision (Ireland) Act 1878 (41 & 42 Vict. c. 57)

== 8 & 9 Hen. 8 (1516) ==
This session was also traditionally cited as 8 & 9 H. 8.

- c. 9 Foreigners fishing off coast to land one-third of the catch in Ireland

== 13 Hen. 8 (1521) ==
This session was also traditionally cited as 13 H. 8.

- c. 1 Burning of Corn Act 1521 An Act against burning of corne, as well in Reekes in the field, as in villages and townes. — repealed by Criminal Statutes (Ireland) Repeal Act 1828 (9 Geo. 4. c. 53)
- c. 2 Exportation of Wool Act 1521 An Act against the transporting of wooll and flockes. — repealed by Repeal of Acts Concerning Importation Act 1822 (3 Geo. 4. c. 41)
- c. 3 Jurors (Attaint) Act 1521 An Act touching jurors to passe in attaint. — repealed by Juries (Ireland) Act 1833 (3 & 4 Will. 4. c. 91)

== 25 Hen. 8 (1533) ==
This session was also traditionally cited as 25 H. 8.

- c. 1 Leasing of Corn Act 1533 An Act against leasers of corne. — repealed by Statute Law Revision (Ireland) Act 1878 (41 & 42 Vict. c. 57)
- c. 2 Galtrim Union Act 1533 An Act for the united of the parsonage of Galtrim to the Priorie of S. Peters by Trymme. — repealed by Statute Law Revision (Ireland) Act 1878 (41 & 42 Vict. c. 57)

== 28 Hen. 8 (1537) ==
This session was also traditionally cited as 28 & 29 Hen. 8, 28 H. 8 or 28 & 29 H. 8.

- c. 1 [28 & 29 Hen. 8. c. 1] Earl of Kildare Attainder Act 1537 An Act for the attainder of the Earle of Kildare and others.
- c. 2 [28 & 29 Hen. 8. c. 2] Marriage Act 1537^{(Republic of Ireland)} or Marriage (No. 1) Act 1537 An Act for the Succession of the King and Queene Anne.
- c. 3 Absentees Act 1537 An Act of Absentees. — repealed by Statute Law Revision (Ireland) Act 1878 (41 & 42 Vict. c. 57)
- c. 4 Poynings' Act Modification Act 1537 An Act making good all the Statutes in the same Parliament, notwithstanding Poynings A
- ct. (Note: 10 Hen. 7. c. 4 (I)) — repealed by Statute Law Revision (Ireland) Act 1878 (41 & 42 Vict. c. 57)
- c. 5 Act of Supremacy (Ireland) 1537 An Act authorising the King, His Heirs and Successors, to be supreme Head of the Church of Ireland. — repealed for the Republic of Ireland by Statute Law Revision (Pre-Union Irish Statutes) Act 1962 (No. 29) and for Northern Ireland by the Statute Law Revision Act 1950 (14 Geo. 6.c. 6)
- c. 6 [28 & 29 Hen. 8. c. 7] Act of Appeals (Ireland) 1537 An Act of appeales.
- c. 7 [28 & 29 Hen. 8. c. 8] Treason Act (Ireland) 1537 An Act of Slaunder. — repealed by Statute Law Revision (Ireland) Act 1879 (42 & 43 Vict. c. 24)
- c. 8 First Fruits Act 1537 An Act for the payment of first fruites. — repealed by Church Temporalities (Ireland) Act 1833 (3 & 4 Will. 4. c. 37)
- c. 9 [28 & 29 Hen. 8. c. 13] Delahyde's Estate Act 1537 An Act entitling the King to Delahydes lands in Carbry.
- c. 10 [28 & 29 Hen. 8. c. 15] Restitution of Stolen Goods Act 1537 An Act how persons robbed shall be restored to their goods. — repealed by Criminal Statutes (Ireland) Repeal Act 1828 (9 Geo. 4. c. 53)
- c. 11 [28 & 29 Hen. 8. c. 16] Tribute to Irishmen Restraint Act 1537 An Act restrayning tribute to be given to Irishmen. — repealed by Statute Law Revision (Ireland) Act 1878 (41 & 42 Vict. c. 57)
- [28 & 29 Hen. 8. c. 17] Marriage (No. 2) Act 1537^{(Republic of Ireland)} Thacte of succession betwixt the kyng and queane Jane.
- [28 & 29 Hen. 8. c. 18] (First fruits of abbeys)
- c. 12 [28 & 29 Hen. 8. c. 19] An Act against Proctors to be any members of the Parliament. — repealed by Statute Law Revision (Ireland) Act 1878 (41 & 42 Vict. c. 57)
- [28 & 29 Hen. 8. c. 20] (Pardons)
- [28 & 29 Hen. 8. c. 21] (Duleek)
- c. 13 [28 & 29 Hen. 8. c. 23] An Act against the authoritie of the Bishop of Rome. — repealed by Statute Law Revision (Ireland) Act 1878 (41 & 42 Vict. c. 57)
- [28 & 29 Hen. 8. c. 24] County of Wexford Act 1537 (Missing)
- c. 14 [28 & 29 Hen. 8. c. 25] Twentieth Part of Ecclesiastical Livings Act 1537 An Act for the twentieth part of Eclesiasticall livings. — repealed by Church Temporalities (Ireland) Act 1833 (3 & 4 Will. 4. c. 37)
- c. 15 [28 & 29 Hen. 8. c. 26] English Order, Habit, and Language Act 1537 An Act for the English order, habite, and language. — repealed by Statute Law Revision (Ireland) Act 1878 (41 & 42 Vict. c. 57)
- c. 16 [28 & 29 Hen. 8. c. 27] Suppression of Abbeys Act 1537 An Act for the supression of Abbeyes. — repealed by Statute Law Revision (Ireland) Act 1878 (41 & 42 Vict. c. 57)
- c. 17 [28 & 29 Hen. 8. c. 28] Exportation of Wool Act 1537 An Act concerning the transportation of wooll and flockes. — repealed by Repeal of Acts Concerning Importation Act 1822 (3 Geo. 4. c. 41)
- c. 18 [28 & 29 Hen. 8. c. 29] Administration of Estates Act 1537^{(Republic of Ireland)} An Act concerning the proofe of Testaments, and the graunting of letters of administration.
- c. 19 [28 & 29 Hen. 8. c. 30] Act of Faculties 1537 The Act of Faculties. — repealed by Statute Law Revision (Ireland) Act 1878 (41 & 42 Vict. c. 57)
- c. 20 [28 & 29 Hen. 8. c. 31] An Act declaring the Effect of Poynings Act. — repealed by Statute Law Revision (Ireland) Act 1879 (42 & 43 Vict. c. 24)
- [28 & 29 Hen. 8. c. 32] Borough of Wexford Act 1537 (Missing)
- c. 21 [28 & 29 Hen. 8. c. 34] An Act concerning penall Statutes. — repealed by Statute Law Revision (Ireland) Act 1878 (41 & 42 Vict. c. 57)
- [28 & 29 Hen. 8. c. 35] (Pardons)
- c. 22 [28 & 29 Hen. 8. c. 36] Inland Navigation Act 1537^{(Republic of Ireland)} An Act concerning the Weares upon the river of Barrow & other rivers in the countie of Kilkenny.
- [28 & 29 Hen. 8. c. 37] Boyne Weirs Act 1537 Act for the breaking of wares weirs in the river of Boyne.
- c. 23 [28 & 29 Hen. 8. c. 38] An Act for the Parsonage of Dongarvan.
- [28 & 29 Hen. 8. c. 39] (Confirming the orders to be made by the commissioners and others)
- c. 24 [28 & 29 Hen. 8. c. 40] Leasing of Corn Act 1537 An Act against leasers of corne. — repealed by Statute Law Revision (Ireland) Act 1878 (41 & 42 Vict. c. 57)
- [28 & 29 Hen. 8. c. 41] (Declaration of the act of subsidy (taxes))
- [28 & 29 Hen. 8. c. 42] (Orders taken by the commissioners and others)
- c. 25 [28 & 29 Hen. 8. c. 33] An Act concerning leases. — repealed by Statute Law Revision (Ireland) Act 1878 (41 & 42 Vict. c. 57)
- c. 26 An Act for the first fruites of Abbeyes, Priories, and Colledges. — repealed by Statute Law Revision (Ireland) Act 1878 (41 & 42 Vict. c. 57)
- c. 27 [28 & 29 Hen. 8. c. 9] Subsidy Act 1547 An Act of Subsidie. — repealed by Statute Law Revision (Ireland) Act 1878 (41 & 42 Vict. c. 57)
- c. 28 [28 & 29 Hen. 8. c. 22] Prohibition of Marrying with Irishmen Act 1547 The Act for marrying with Irishmen.

== 33 Hen. 8 (1542) ==
This session was also traditionally cited as 33 Hen. 8 Sess. 1,33 Hen. 8 sess. 1,33 Hen. 8 Stat. 1, 33 Hen. 8 St. 1, 33 Hen. 8 st. 1, 33 H. 8, 33 H. 8. Sess. 1, 33 H. 8. sess. 1, 33 H. 8 Stat. 1, 33 H. 8 St. 1, 33 H. 8 st. 1

- c. 1 Crown of Ireland Act 1542^{(United Kingdom)} An Act that the King and his successours shall be Kings of Ireland. (still in force in UK) — repealed for the Republic of Ireland by Statute Law Revision (Pre-Union Irish Statutes) Act 1962 (No. 29)
- c. 2 Gray Merchants Act 1541 An Act concerning gray Merchants. — repealed by Forestalling, Regrating, etc. Act 1844 (7 & 8 Vict. c. 24)
- c. 3 Mispleading and Jeoyfailes Act 1542 An Act that the plaintife in assise may abridge his plaint.
- c. 4 Challenges Act 1541 An Act concerning challenges.
- c. 5 Servants' Embezzlement Act 1541 An Act that maketh it felony in the Servant to run away with his Masters Casket, &c. — repealed by Criminal Statutes (Ireland) Repeal Act 1828 (9 Geo. 4. c. 53)
- c. 6 Marriage Act 1542^{(Republic of Ireland)} An Act concerning marriages.
- c. 7 Distraint (Lords and Lands) Act 1541 An Act for all Lords to distraine upon the Lands of them holden, and to make their Avowrie, not naming the Tenant but the Land. — repealed by Landlord and Tenant Law Amendment (Ireland) Act 1860 (23 & 24 Vict. c. 154)
- c. 8 Capacities of Religious Persons Act 1541 An Act for capacities, and for discharging religious persons of their order.
- c. 9 Servants' Wages Act 1542 An Act for servants wages. — repealed by Combinations of Workmen Act 1825 (6 Geo. 4. c. 129)
- c. 10 Joint Tenants Act 1542 An act that joyntenants and tenants in common shall be compelled to make partition. — repealed for the Republic of Ireland by Statute Law Revision (Pre-Union Irish Statutes) Act 1962 (No. 29) and for Northern Ireland by the Statute Law Revision Act 1950 (14 Geo. 6.c. 6)
- c. 11 Lessees and Recoveries Act 1541 An Act that lessees for yeares may falsifie recoveries against the lessors.
- c. 12 Tithes Act 1542 An Act for Tythes.
- c. 13 Lessees and Recoveries Act 1541 An Act concerning attournements. — repealed by Statute Law Revision (Ireland) Act 1878 (41 & 42 Vict. c. 57)
- c. 14 Vicarages Act 1541 An Act for erecting of Vicarages. — repealed by Statute Law Revision (Ireland) Act 1878 (41 & 42 Vict. c. 57)
- c. 15 Vagabonds Act 1541 An Act for vagabonds. — repealed by Statute Law Revision (Ireland) Act 1878 (41 & 42 Vict. c. 57)

== 33 Hen. 8 Sess. 2 (1542) ==
This session was also traditionally cited as 33 Hen. 8 sess. 2, 33 Hen. 8 Stat. 2, 33 Hen. 8 St. 2, 33 Hen. 8 st. 2, 33 H. 8. Sess. 2, 33 H, 8. sess. 2, 33 H. 8 Stat. 2, 33 H. 8 St. 2, 33 H. 8 st. 2

- c. 1 Parliament Adjournment and Elections Act 1542 An Act for adjornement of the Parliament and the place to hold the same, and what persons shall be chosen Knights and Burgesses. — repealed by Statute Law Revision (Ireland) Act 1878 (41 & 42 Vict. c. 57)
- c. 2 Lord Justice Elections Act 1542 An Act for the election of the Lord Justice.
- c. 3 Mishaps and Jeofails Act 1542 An Act touching Mispleading and Jeoyfailes. — repealed for the Republic of Ireland by Statute Law Revision (Pre-Union Irish Statutes) Act 1962 (No. 29) and for Northern Ireland by the Statute Law Revision Act 1950 (14 Geo. 6.c. 6)
- c. 4 Crown Lands Act 1542 An Act concerning lands given by the King.— repealed by Statute Law Revision (Ireland) Act 1878 (41 & 42 Vict. c. 57)
- c. 5 Suppression of Kilmainham Act 1542 An Act for the Suppression of Kilmaynham and other religious houses.

== 34 Hen. 8 (1543) ==
This session was also traditionally cited as 34 Hen. 8 Stat. 1, 34 Hen. 8 St. 1, 34 Hen. 8 st. 1, 34 H. 8, 34 H. 8. Sess. 1, 34 H. 8 Stat. 1, 34 H. 8 St. 1, 34 H. 8 st. 1

- c. 1 Counties of Meath and Westmeath Act 1543^{(Republic of Ireland)} An Act for the division of Meath into two shires.
- c. 2 Appearance and Service Discharge Act 1543 An Act that persons standing bound in any Court for their apparance, and being in Service, to be discharged by Writ.— repealed by Statute Law Revision (Ireland) Act 1878 (41 & 42 Vict. c. 57)

== 34 Hen. 8 Sess. 2 (1543) ==
This session was also traditionally cited as 34 Hen. 8 Stat. 2, 34 Hen. 8 St. 2, 34 Hen. 8 st. 2, 34 H. 8. Sess. 2, 34 H. 8 Stat. 2, 34 H. 8 St. 2, 34 H. 8 st. 2

- c. 1 Manor of Dungarvan Act 1542 An Act touching the mannor and Castle of Dongarvan.

== 3 & 4 Phil. & Mar. (1556) ==
The parliament of Philip and Mary, which met from 1 June 1557.

This session was also traditionally cited as 3 & 4 Philip and Mary, 3 & 4 Ph. & Mar. and 3 & 4 P. & M..

Short title, or popular name	Citation	Royal assent
Long title
Counties of Leix and Offaly Act 1556	3 & 4 Phil. & Mar. c. 1 (I)	
An act for the disposition of Leix and Offaily.
Settlement of Laois and Offaly Act 1556	3 & 4 Phil. & Mar. c. 2 (I)	
An Act whereby the King and Queen's Majesties, and the Heires and Successors of the Queen, be entituled to the Counties of Leix, Slewmarge, Irry, Glinmaliry, and Offaily, and for making the same Countries Shire Grounds. (Repealed for the Republic of Ireland by Statute Law Revision (Pre-Union Irish Statutes) Act 1962 (No. 29))
Shire Grounds Act 1556 (repealed)	3 & 4 Phil. & Mar. c. 3 (I)	
An Act to convert diverse wast grounds into shire grounds. (Repealed by Statute Law Revision (Ireland) Act 1878 (41 & 42 Vict. c. 57))
Poynings' Act Explanation Act 1556 (repealed)	3 & 4 Phil. & Mar. c. 4 (I)	
An Act declaring how Poynings act (Note: 10 Hen. 7. c. 4 (I)) shall be expounded. (Repealed by Statute Law Revision (Ireland) Act 1878 (41 & 42 Vict. c. 57))
Vagabonds Act 1556 (repealed)	3 & 4 Phil. & Mar. c. 5 (I)	
An Act against Corsors and idle men. (Repealed by Statute Law Revision (Ireland) Act 1878 (41 & 42 Vict. c. 57))
Stolen Goods Act 1556 (repealed)	3 & 4 Phil. & Mar. c. 6 (I)	
An Act that the owners of stolen goods may bee restored thereunto. (Repealed by Criminal Statutes (Ireland) Repeal Act 1828 (9 Geo. 4. c. 53))
Aqua Vitae Act 1556 (repealed)	3 & 4 Phil. & Mar. c. 7 (I)	
An Act against making of Aqua vitae. (Repealed by Statute Law Revision (Ireland) Act 1878 (41 & 42 Vict. c. 57))
	3 & 4 Phil. & Mar. c. 8 (I)	
(Repeal of Statutes against Rome) (Repealed by Statute Law Revision (Ireland) Act 1878 (41 & 42 Vict. c. 57))
	3 & 4 Phil. & Mar. c. 9 (I)	
(Revival of Statutes against heresy)
	3 & 4 Phil. & Mar. c. 10 (I)	
(First fruits)
Treason Act 1556	3 & 4 Phil. & Mar. c. 11 (I)	
An Act whereby certein Offences be made Treasons; and also for the Government of the King and Queen's Majestie's Issue. (Repealed for the Republic of Ireland by Statute Law Revision (Pre-Union Irish Statutes) Act 1962 (No. 29))
	3 & 4 Phil. & Mar. c. 12 (I)	
(Subsidy) (Repealed by Statute Law Revision (Ireland) Act 1878 (41 & 42 Vict. c. 57))
	3 & 4 Phil. & Mar. c. 13 (I)	
(Legitimacy of the Queen) (Repealed by Statute Law Revision (Ireland) Act 1878 (41 & 42 Vict. c. 57))
Queen Regent's Prerogative Act (Ireland) 1556^{(United Kingdom)} (repealed)	3 & 4 Phil. & Mar. c. 14 (I)	
An Act declarynge that the Regal Power of this Realm is in the Queene's Majestie, as fullie and absolutlie as ever it was in any of her moost noble Progenitours, Kynges of this Realme. (Repealed for the Republic of Ireland by Statute Law Revision (Pre-Union Irish Statutes) Act 1962 (No. 29) and for Northern Ireland by Statute Law (Repeals) Act 1973 (c. 39))
	3 & 4 Phil. & Mar. c. 15 (I)	
(Bringing in and marrying with Scots)

== 2 Eliz. 1 (1560) ==
The 1st parliament of Elizabeth I, which met from 12 January 1560 to 1 February 1560.

This session was also traditionally cited as 2 Eliz.

Short title, or popular name	Citation	Royal assent
Long title
Act of Supremacy (Ireland) 1560^{(United Kingdom)}	2 Eliz. 1. c. 1 (I)	1 February 1560
An Act restoring to the Crown, the auncient Jurisdiction over the State Ecclesiasticall and Spirituall, and abolishing all forreine Power repugnant to the same. (Repealed for the Republic of Ireland by Statute Law Revision (Pre-Union Irish Statutes) Act 1962 (No. 29))
Act of Uniformity 1560 (repealed)	2 Eliz. 1. c. 2 (I)	1 February 1560
An Act for the Uniformitie of Common Prayer and Service in the Church and the Administration of the Sacraments. (Repealed for the Republic of Ireland by Statute Law Revision (Pre-Union Irish Statutes) Act 1962 (No. 29) and for Northern Ireland by the Statute Law Revision Act 1950 (14 Geo. 6. c. 6))
First Fruits and Rectories Act 1560 (repealed)	2 Eliz. 1. c. 3 (I)	1 February 1560
An Act for the restitution of the first fruits and twentieth part, and rents reserved nomine decime or vices. and of Parsonsages impropriate to the imperiall crowne of this Realme. (Repealed by Statute Law Revision (Ireland) Act 1878 (41 & 42 Vict. c. 57))
Bishops Consecration Act 1560 (repealed)	2 Eliz. 1. c. 4 (I)	1 February 1560
An Act for the conferring and consecrating of Archbishops and Bishops within this Realm. (Repealed by Statute Law Revision (Ireland) Act 1878 (41 & 42 Vict. c. 57))
Crown of Ireland Act 1560 (repealed)	2 Eliz. 1. c. 5 (I)	1 February 1560
An Act of recognition of the Queenes title to the imperiall crowne of this Realme. (Repealed by Statute Law Revision (Ireland) Act 1878 (41 & 42 Vict. c. 57))
Treason Act 1560 (repealed)	2 Eliz. 1. c. 6 (I)	1 February 1560
An Act whereby certaine Offences be made Treasons. (Repealed by Statute Law Revision (Ireland) Act 1878 (41 & 42 Vict. c. 57) and for the Republic of Ireland by Statute Law Revision (Pre-Union Irish Statutes) Act 1962 (No. 29))
Priory of St. John Act 1560	2 Eliz. 1. c. 7 (I)	1 February 1560
An Act for the restitution of the late Priorie of S. Johns Jerusalem in Ireland to the imperiall crowne of this Realme.

== 11 Eliz. 1 (1568) ==
The 1st session of the 2nd Parliament of Elizabeth I, held from 17 January 1569.

This session was also traditionally cited as 11 Eliz., 11 Eliz. Sess. 1, 11 Eliz. sess. 1, 11 Eliz. Sess. 1 or 11 Eliz. sess. 1.

Short title, or popular name	Citation	Royal assent
Long title
Subsidy Act 1568 (repealed)	11 Eliz. 1. c. 1 (I)	
An Act of Subsidie graunted to the Queene. (Repealed by Statute Law Revision (Ireland) Act 1878 (41 & 42 Vict. c. 57))
Tanning of Leather Act 1568	11 Eliz. 1. c. 2 (I)	
An Act for the limitation of places for tanning of leather.
Eustace's Estate Act 1568	11 Eliz. 1. c. 3 (I)	
An Act confirming the Queenes title, and the interest of the patentees in the lands belonging to Christopher Eustace and others.
Irishry Regulation Act 1568	11 Eliz. 1. c. 4 (I)	
An Act that five of the best and eldest of every nation amongst the Irishry, shall bring in all the idle persons of their sirname to be justified by law.
Grey Merchants and Wages Act 1568 (repealed)	11 Eliz. 1. c. 5 (I)	
An Act for reviving the statute against grey merchants, the statute for servants wages, and the statute of feofayles. (Repealed by Statute Law Revision (Ireland) Act 1878 (41 & 42 Vict. c. 57))
	11 Eliz. 1. c. 6 (I)	
(Unknown)
Scots Act 1568 (repealed)	11 Eliz. 1. c. 7 (I)	
An Act that the Acte of retayninge of Scots shall not extende to the Governours of this Realme. (Repealed by Statute Law Revision (Ireland) Act 1878 (41 & 42 Vict. c. 57))

== 11 Eliz. 1. Sess. 2 (1568) ==
The 2nd session of the 2nd Parliament of Elizabeth I.

This session was also traditionally cited as 11 Eliz. 1. sess. 2' 11 Eliz. Sess. 2' or 11 Eliz. sess. 2.

Short title, or popular name	Citation	Royal assent
Long title
Parliament of Ireland Act 1568 (repealed)	11 Eliz. 1 Sess. 2. c. 1 (I)	
An Act authorising Statutes to be made in this Parliament, notwithstanding Poynings Act. (Repealed by Statute Law Revision (Ireland) Act 1878 (41 & 42 Vict. c. 57))

== 11 Eliz. 1. Sess. 3 (1568) ==
The 3rd session of the 2nd Parliament of Elizabeth I.

This session was also traditionally cited as 11 Eliz. sess. 3, 11 Eliz. Sess. 3 or 11 Eliz. sess. 3.

Short title, or popular name	Citation	Royal assent
Long title
O'Neill Attainder Act 1568	11 Eliz. 1 Sess. 3. c. 1 (I)	
An Act for the attainder of Shane Oneyle and entitling of the Crown to the countrey of Tyrone, and to other countries and territories in Ulster.
Trinity Term Act 1568 (repealed)	11 Eliz. 1 Sess. 3. c. 2 (I)	
An Act for the making of Trinity Term shorter, and for the Commencement thereof. (Repealed by Statute Law Revision (Ireland) Act 1878 (41 & 42 Vict. c. 57))
Knight's Estate Act 1570	11 Eliz. 1 Sess. 3. c. 3 (I)	
An Act Entituling the Queen's Majesty, her Heirs and Successors, to Thomas Knight of the Vallies-Lands in Munster.
Salmon and Eel Fisheries Act 1568 (repealed)	11 Eliz. 1 Sess. 3. c. 4 (I)	
An Act for the preservation of Salmon-fry and Eel-fry. (Repealed by Statute Law Revision (Ireland) Act 1878 (41 & 42 Vict. c. 57))
Hemp and Hides Act 1568 (repealed)	11 Eliz. 1 Sess. 3. c. 5 (I)	
An Act against laying Hemp, Flax, and Limed Hides, in any Fresh-water or River. (Repealed by Statute Law Revision (Ireland) Act 1878 (41 & 42 Vict. c. 57))
Munster and Connaught Dignities Act 1568 (repealed)	11 Eliz. 1 Sess. 3. c. 6 (I)	
An Act Authorizing the Governour for Ten years to come, to present to the Dignities of Munster and Connaught. (Repealed by Statute Law Revision (Ireland) Act 1878 (41 & 42 Vict. c. 57))
Captainships and Extortions Act 1568 (repealed)	11 Eliz. 1 Sess. 3. c. 7 (I)	
An Act for taking away Captainships, and all Extortions belonging thereunto, from the Lords and Great Men of this Realm. (Repealed by Statute Law Revision (Ireland) Act 1878 (41 & 42 Vict. c. 57))
Poynings' Act Amendment Act 1568 (repealed)	11 Eliz. 1 Sess. 3. c. 8 (I)	
An Act that there be no Bill certified into England for the Repeal or Suspending of the Statute past in Poyning's time, before the same Bill be first agreed on in a Session of a Parliament holden in this Realm, by the greater number of the Lords and Commons. (Repealed by Statute Law Revision (Ireland) Act 1878 (41 & 42 Vict. c. 57))
Shire Grounds Act 1568 (repealed)	11 Eliz. 1 Sess. 3. c. 9 (I)	
An Act for the turning of Countries that be not Shire-grounds into Shire-grounds. (Repealed by Statute Law Revision (Ireland) Act 1878 (41 & 42 Vict. c. 57))
Exportation Restrictions Act 1568 (repealed)	11 Eliz. 1 Sess. 3. c. 10 (I)	
An Act for the staying of Wooll, Flocks, Tallow, and other Necessaries, within this Realm. (Repealed by Repeal of Acts Concerning Importation Act 1822 (3 Geo. 4. c. 41))
Wine Trade and Customs Act 1568 (repealed)	11 Eliz. 1 Sess. 3. c. 11 (I) (Note: Also cited as 11 Eliz. Sess. 4. c. 1.)	
An Act giving Order for bringing in of Wines into this Realm, where they shall be Discharged, who shall Rate the Prices of them, and also for Grant of Custom out of the same Wines. (Repealed by Statute Law Revision (Ireland) Act 1878 (41 & 42 Vict. c. 57))
Earl of Kildare Restoration Act 1568	11 Eliz. 1 Sess. 3. c. 12 (I)	
An Act restoring the Earle of Kildare and his brothers and sisters to their blood.

== 12 Eliz. 1 (1570) ==
The 4th session of the 2nd parliament of Elizabeth I.

This session was also traditionally cited as 12 Eliz.

Short title, or popular name	Citation	Royal assent
Long title
Free Schools Act 1570	12 Eliz. 1. c. 1 (I)	
An Act for the Erection of Free Schooles. (Repealed for the Republic of Ireland by Statute Law Revision (Pre-Union Irish Statutes) Act 1962 (No. 29))
Exemplifications of Records Act 1570 (repealed)	12 Eliz. 1. c. 2 (I)	
An Act that Exemplifications shall be of the same Effect and Strength as the Record or Matter exemplified should be. (Repealed for the Republic of Ireland by Statute Law Revision (Pre-Union Irish Statutes) Act 1962 (No. 29) and for Northern Ireland by the Statute Law Revision Act 1950 (14 Geo. 6. c. 6))
Corn Measures Act 1570 (repealed)	12 Eliz. 1. c. 3 (I)	
An Act for the establishing the Standard of measures for corne within certain shires of this realme. (Repealed by Weights and Measures Act 1824 (5 Geo. 4. c. 74))
Irishry and Degenerate English Lands Act 1570 (repealed)	12 Eliz. 1. c. 4 (I)	
An Act authorising the Governour, with the advise of the more part of the Councell, to and upon the Queenes pleasure signified, to graunt letters patents to the Irishry and degenerate English of their landes, &c. (Repealed by Statute Law Revision (Ireland) Act 1879 (42 & 43 Vict. c. 24))

== 13 Eliz. 1 (1571) ==
The 5th session of the 2nd parliament of Elizabeth I.

This session was also traditionally cited as 13 Eliz.

Short title, or popular name	Citation	Royal assent
Long title
Staple Merchants Act 1571 (repealed)	13 Eliz. 1. c. 1 (I)	
An Act that such cloth and stuffe as shall be wrought by the wooll, flockes, linnen yarne, woollen yarne, Sheepefell, Calfefell, Goatefell, Redde Dearefell, or Fallow Dearefell within this Realme shall bee transported for merchandise onely by the Merchaunts within every Staple, Cities and Townes of this Realme, and by the free Merchants of Boroughes and privileged townes, and by none other. (Repealed by Repeal of Acts Concerning Importation Act 1822 (3 Geo. 4. c. 41))
Exemplification of Records Act 1571	13 Eliz. 1. c. 2 (I)	
(Exemplification of records)
Corn Measures Act 1571	13 Eliz. 1. c. 3 (I)	
(Standard measures for corn)
Exportation Restrictions (Amendment) Act 1571 (repealed)	13 Eliz. 1. c. 4 (I)	
An explanation of the Act made in a Session of this Parliament (Note: Exportation Restrictions Act 1568 (11 Eliz. 1 Sess. 3. c. 10 (I))) for the staying of Wooll, Flockes, Tallow, and other things mentioning in the said Act, and certain articles added to the same act. (Repealed by Statute Law Revision (Ireland) Act 1878 (41 & 42 Vict. c. 57))
FitzGerald's Attainder Act 1571	13 Eliz. 1. c. 5 (I)	
An Act for the attainder of John fitz Gerald, called in his life time the white Knight, otherwise John Oge fitz John Knight fitz Gybbons.
Primate of Armagh's Estate Act 157	13 Eliz. 1. c. 6 (I)	
An Act authorising the Primate of Armagh to set his lands in the Irish pale for yeares without the assent of his Chapter.
Quemerford's Attainder Act 1571	13 Eliz. 1. c. 7 (I)	
An Act for the attaindour of Thomas Quemerford.

== 27 Eliz. 1 (1585) ==
The 1st session of the 3rd parliament of Elizabeth I, held from 26 April 1585.

This session was also traditionally cited as 27 Eliz.

Short title, or popular name	Citation	Royal assent
Long title
Viscount Baltinglass' Attainder Act 1585	27 Eliz. 1. c. 1 (I)	
An Act for the attaindour of James Eustace late Viscount of Baltinglas, and others.
Delahyde's Restoration Act 1585	27 Eliz. 1. c. 2 (I)	
An Act for the restitution in bloud of Laurence Delahyde.

== 28 Eliz. 1 (1586) ==
The 2nd session of the 3rd parliament of Elizabeth I.

This session was also traditionally cited as 28 Eliz.

Short title, or popular name	Citation	Royal assent
Long title
Perjury Act 1586^{(Republic of Ireland)}	28 Eliz. 1. c. 1 (I)	
An Act concerning wilfull perjurie.
Witchcraft Act 1586 or the Witchcraft Act (Ireland) 1586 (repealed)	28 Eliz. 1. c. 2 (I)	
An Act against Witchcraft and Sorcerie. (Repealed by Offences Against the Person (Ireland) Act 1829 (10 Geo. 4. c. 34))
Forgery of Evidences Act 1586 (repealed)	28 Eliz. 1. c. 3 (I)	
An Act against Forging of Evidences, &c. (Repealed by Statute Law Revision (Ireland) Act 1878 (41 & 42 Vict. c. 57))
Wine Imports and Customs Act 1586 (repealed)	28 Eliz. 1. c. 4 (I)	
An Act of Imports and Customs of Wine, &c. (Repealed by Repeal of Acts Concerning Importation Act 1822 (3 Geo. 4. c. 41))
Fraudulent Conveyances by Rebels Act 1586 (repealed)	28 Eliz. 1. c. 5 (I)	
An Act concerning the Avoiding of Fraudulent Conveyances, made by the late Rebels in Ireland. (Repealed by Statute Law Revision (Ireland) Act 1878 (41 & 42 Vict. c. 57))
Foreign Coin Counterfeiting Act 1586 (repealed)	28 Eliz. 1. c. 6 (I)	
An Act against Forging and Counterfeiting Foreign Coin, &c. (Repealed by Coinage Offences Act 1832 (2 & 3 Will. 4. c. 34))
Earl of Desmond's Attainder Act 1586	28 Eliz. 1. c. 7 (I)	
An Act for the Attainder of the late Earl of Desmond, and others mentioned in this Act.
Brown's Attainder Act 1586	28 Eliz. 1. c. 8 (I)	
An Act for the Attainder of John Brown of Knockmonhie, and others mentioned in this Act.
Taffe's Wife Restoration Act 1586	28 Eliz. 1. c. 9 (I)	
An Act for the restitution in bloud of Taffes wife.

== See also ==
- List of acts of the Parliament of Ireland
- List of acts of the Oireachtas
- List of legislation in the United Kingdom
