= Statute Law Revision (Pre-Union Irish Statutes) Act 1962 =

Oireachtas
- Long title: AN ACT TO PROMOTE THE REVISION OF THE STATUTE LAW BY REPEALING EXPRESSLY CERTAIN PRE-UNION IRISH STATUTES OR PARTS OF SUCH STATUTES WHICH MAY BE REGARDED AS SPENT OR WHICH HAVE CEASED TO BE IN FORCE OTHERWISE THAN BY EXPRESS REPEAL OR WHICH HAVE, BY LAPSE OF TIME OR OTHERWISE, BECOME UNNECESSARY.
- Citation: No. 29 of 1962
- Signed by: President Éamon de Valera
- Signed: 24 November 1962
- Commenced: 24 November 1962

Legislative history
- Introduced by: Minister for Justice (Charles Haughey)
- Introduced: 11 July 1962
- Status: Current legislation

The Statute Law Revision (Pre-Union Irish Statutes) Act 1962 (No 29) is an act of the Oireachtas.

The act repealed various acts of the pre-Union Parliament of Ireland, passed from 1459 to 1800, either wholly or in part, including the Crown of Ireland Act 1542 making the king of England also king of Ireland, the Counties of Leix and Offaly Act 1556 declaring the title of the Crown to those counties, and various acts of Supremacy and Uniformity, and the Irish version of the Act of Union 1800. Some of the equivalent English and British acts which also applied to Ireland were not explicitly repealed in the Republic of Ireland until later statute law revision acts (for example, the British version of the Act of Union in the Statute Law Revision Act 1983), even though their application had been overtaken by events.

This act has not been amended.

== See also ==
- Statute Law Revision Act
