= List of acts of the Parliament of Ireland, 1791–1800 =

This is a list of acts of the Parliament of Ireland for the years from 1791 to 1800.

See also the list of acts of the Parliament of Ireland.

The number shown by each act's title is its chapter number. Acts are cited using this number, preceded by the years of the reign during which the relevant parliamentary session was held; thus the act concerning assay passed in 1783 is cited as "23 & 24 Geo. 3. c. 23", meaning the 23rd act passed during the session that started in the 23rd year of the reign of George III and which finished in the 24th year of that reign. The modern convention is to use Arabic numerals in citations (thus "40 Geo. 3" rather than "40 Geo. III"). Acts of the reign of Elizabeth I are formally cited without a regnal numeral in the Republic of Ireland.

Acts passed by the Parliament of Ireland did not have a short title; however, some of these acts have subsequently been given a short title by acts of the Parliament of the United Kingdom, acts of the Parliament of Northern Ireland, or acts of the Oireachtas. This means that some acts have different short titles in the Republic of Ireland and Northern Ireland respectively. Official short titles are indicated by the flags of the respective jurisdictions.

A number of the acts included in this list are still in force in Northern Ireland or the Republic of Ireland. Because these two jurisdictions are entirely separate, the version of an act in force in one may differ from the version in force in the other; similarly, an act may have been repealed in one but not in the other.

A number of acts passed by the Parliament of England or the Parliament of Great Britain also extended to Ireland during this period.

== 31 Geo. 3 (1791) ==
The 2nd session of the 5th parliament of George III, which met from 20 January 1791 to 5 May 1791.

This session was also traditionally cited as 31 G. 3.

=== Public acts ===
Short title, or popular name	Citation	Royal assent
Long title
Trade and Navigation Act 1791 (repealed)	31 Geo. 3. c. 1 (I)	19 March 1791
An Act for granting for one Year the several Duties therein mentioned, in Lieu of all other Duties payable upon the Articles therein specified during the said Term, and for continuing the Effect of a Treaty of Commerce and Navigation between His Majesty and the Most Christian King, (Note: 'Most Christian King' is a reference to the King of France.) and for regulating the Trade between this Kingdom and His Majesty's Colonies, and for other Purposes therein mentioned. (Repealed by Statute Law Revision (Ireland) Act 1879 (42 & 43 Vict. c. 24))
Loan and Annuities Act 1791 (repealed)	31 Geo. 3. c. 2 (I)	19 March 1791
An Act for securing the Payment of the Annuities, and of the Interest upon the Principal Sums therein provided for, and towards the Discharge of such Principal Sums in such Manner as therein is directed, and for enabling the Officers of His Majesty's Treasury to receive certain Sums for a limited Time in Manner therein mentioned, and for other Purposes. (Repealed by Statute Law Revision (Ireland) Act 1879 (42 & 43 Vict. c. 24))
Salaries, Carriages, and Hawkers Duties Act 1791 (repealed)	31 Geo. 3. c. 3 (I)	19 March 1791
An Act for granting unto His Majesty, His Heirs and Successors, a Tax on all Salaries, Profits of Employments, Fees and Pensions, and certain Duties upon Carriages, and for licensing Hawkers, Pedlars, and other Persons therein mentioned. (Repealed by Statute Law Revision (Ireland) Act 1879 (42 & 43 Vict. c. 24))
Trade with the United States Act 1791 (repealed)	31 Geo. 3. c. 4 (I)	19 March 1791
An Act for further continuing an Act, Entitled, "An Act for facilitating the Trade and Intercourse between this Kingdom and the United States of America." (Note: Trade with United States Act 1788 (28 Geo. 3. c. 18 (I))) (Repealed by Statute Law Revision (Ireland) Act 1879 (42 & 43 Vict. c. 24))
Tobacco, Sugar, and Coffee Trade Act 1791 (repealed)	31 Geo. 3. c. 5 (I)	19 March 1791
An Act for regulating and extending the Tobacco, Sugar, and Coffee Trade. (Repealed by Statute Law Revision (Ireland) Act 1879 (42 & 43 Vict. c. 24))
Agriculture and Manufactures Grant Act 1791 (repealed)	31 Geo. 3. c. 6 (I)	19 March 1791
An Act for granting the Sum of Five Thousand Pounds to the Dublin Society, for the Purposes therein mentioned. (Repealed by Statute Law Revision (Ireland) Act 1879 (42 & 43 Vict. c. 24))
Charities Grants Act 1791 (repealed)	31 Geo. 3. c. 7 (I)	19 March 1791
An Act for granting the several Sums therein mentioned, for certain Pious and Charitable Purposes. (Repealed by Statute Law Revision (Ireland) Act 1879 (42 & 43 Vict. c. 24))
Linen Manufactures Grant Act 1791 (repealed)	31 Geo. 3. c. 8 (I)	19 March 1791
An Act for granting the Sum of Four Thousand Pounds to the Trustees of the Linen Manufacture, and for other Purposes. (Repealed by Statute Law Revision (Ireland) Act 1879 (42 & 43 Vict. c. 24))
Export Bounties Act 1791 (repealed)	31 Geo. 3. c. 9 (I)	19 March 1791
An Act for regulating the Payment of Bounties on the Exportation of certain Manufactures of this Kingdom. (Repealed by Statute Law Revision (Ireland) Act 1879 (42 & 43 Vict. c. 24))
Postage Act 1791 (repealed)	31 Geo. 3. c. 10 (I)	19 March 1791
An Act for granting to His Majesty, His Heirs and Successors, certain Duties and Rates upon the Portage and Conveyance of all Letters and Packets within this Kingdom. (Repealed by Statute Law Revision (Ireland) Act 1879 (42 & 43 Vict. c. 24))
Clerks of the Crown and Peace Act 1791 (repealed)	31 Geo. 3. c. 11 (I)	5 May 1791
An Act to enable the Grand Juries of the County of Dublin, and the County of the City of Dublin, to make better Provision for the Clerks of the Crown and Peace by Presentment at each Quarter Sessions for said County and City. (Repealed by Statute Law Revision (Ireland) Act 1879 (42 & 43 Vict. c. 24))
Stamp Act 1791 (repealed)	31 Geo. 3. c. 12 (I)	19 March 1791
An Act for granting to His Majesty, His Heirs and Successors, several Duties therein mentioned, to be levied by the Commissioners for managing the Stamp Duties. (Repealed by Statute Law Revision (Ireland) Act 1879 (42 & 43 Vict. c. 24))
Spirit Licences Act 1791 (repealed)	31 Geo. 3. c. 13 (I)	5 May 1791
An Act for regulating the issuing of Licenses for the Sale of Spiritous Liquors by Retail, and for remedying the Abuses which have arisen from the immoderate Use of such Liquors. (Repealed by Statute Law Revision (Ireland) Act 1879 (42 & 43 Vict. c. 24))
Linen and Hempen Manufactures Act 1791	31 Geo. 3. c. 14 (I)	5 May 1791
An Act for amending the Laws respecting the Linen and Hempen Manufactures.
Imported Malt Duty Act 1791 (repealed)	31 Geo. 3. c. 15 (I)	5 May 1791
An Act for granting unto His Majesty, His Heirs and Successors, an additional Duty on imported Malt. (Repealed by Statute Law Revision (Ireland) Act 1879 (42 & 43 Vict. c. 24))
Revenue Act 1791 (repealed)	31 Geo. 3. c. 16 (I)	5 May 1791
An Act for continuing and amending several Laws relating to His Majesty's Revenue, and for the more effectually preventing of Frauds therein. (Repealed by Statute Law Revision (Ireland) Act 1879 (42 & 43 Vict. c. 24))
Prisoners (Rescue) Act 1791^{(Republic of Ireland)}	31 Geo. 3. c. 17 (I)	5 May 1791
An Act to prevent the horrid Crime of Murder, and to repeal an Act passed in the Tenth Year of King Henry the Seventh, Entitled, "An Act to make Murder of Malice prepensed Treason," (Note: Murder Act (Ireland) 1495 (10 Hen. 7. c. 21 (I))) and for repealing an Act made in the Ninth Year of Queen Anne, Entitled, "An Act for bringing an Appeal in Case of Murder, notwithstanding the Statute of King Henry the Seventh, whereby Murder is made High Treason." (Note: Appeals in Murder Cases Act 1710 (9 Anne c. 4 (I)))
Perjury Act 1791^{(Republic of Ireland)} (repealed)	31 Geo. 3. c. 18 (I)	5 May 1791
An Act to render Prosecutions for Perjury, and Subornation of Perjury, more easy and effectual, and for affirming the Jurisdiction of the Quarter Sessions in Cases of Perjury. (Repealed by Statute Law Revision (Ireland) Act 1879 (42 & 43 Vict. c. 24))
Ecclesiastical Improvements Act 1791 (repealed)	31 Geo. 3. c. 19 (I)	5 May 1791
An Act to amend an Act passed in the Eleventh and Twelfth Years of His present Majesty, Entitled, "An Act for rendering more effectual the several Laws for the better enabling the Clergy having Cure of Souls to reside upon their Benefices, and to build on their respective Glebe Lands, and to prevent Dilapidations, and for the Encouragement of Protestant Schools within this Kingdom of Ireland," (Note: Clergy Residence and Glebe Lands (Ireland) Act 1771 (11 & 12 Geo. 3. c. 17 (I))) and also to amend an Act passed in the Thirteenth and Fourteenth Years of His present Majesty, Entitled, An Act to amend an Act passed in the Eighth Year of His present Majesty, Entitled, "An Act for erecting new Chapels of Ease in the Parish of Armagh, and making such Chapels, and those that are already erected in said Parish, perpetual Cures, and for making a proper Provision for the Maintenance of perpetual Curates to officiate in the same," (Note: Armagh Chapels of Ease Act 1767 (7 Geo. 3. c. 17 (I))) and for other Purposes. (Repealed by Church of Ireland Acts Repeal Act 1851 (14 & 15 Vict. c. 71))
Lottery Ticket Insurance Act 1791	31 Geo. 3. c. 20 (I)	5 May 1791
An Act to regulate the Insurance of Lottery Tickets.
Relief of Insolvent Debtors Act 1791 (repealed)	31 Geo. 3. c. 21 (I)	5 May 1791
An Act for the Relief of insolvent Debtors, with Respect to the Imprisonment of their Persons. (Repealed by Statute Law Revision (Ireland) Act 1879 (42 & 43 Vict. c. 24))
Bank of Ireland Act 1791^{(Republic of Ireland)}	31 Geo. 3. c. 22 (I)	5 May 1791
An Act to extend the Provisions of an Act passed in the Twenty-first and Twenty-second Years of His Majesty's Reign, Entitled, "An Act for establishing a Bank by the Name of the Governor and Company of the Bank of Ireland." (Note: Bank of Ireland Act 1781 (21 & 22 Geo. 3. c. 16 (I)))
Seducing Artificers Act 1791 (repealed)	31 Geo. 3. c. 23 (I)	5 May 1791
An Act to amend an Act, Entitled, "An Act to prevent the Practice of seducing Artificers and Manufacturers of this Kingdom, and of exporting the several Tolls and Utensils made Use of in preparing and working up the Manufactures thereof, into Parts beyond the Seas." (Note: (25 Geo. 3. c. 17 (I))) (Repealed by Statute Law Revision (Ireland) Act 1879 (42 & 43 Vict. c. 24))
City of Cork Act 1791^{(Republic of Ireland)}	31 Geo. 3. c. 24 (I)	5 May 1791
An Act for continuing an Act, passed in the Tenth Year of King George the First, Entitled, "An Act for continuing and amending of the Laws in Relation to Butter and Tallow, and the Casks in which such Goods are to be made up, and in Relation to the curing of Hides, and making up Beef and Pork for Exportation, and for the preventing the Destruction of Salmon." (Note: Butter, Tallow, Hides, Beef, Pork, and Salmon Act 1723 (10 Geo. 1. c. 9 (I)))
Recognizances Act 1791	31 Geo. 3. c. 25 (I)	5 May 1791
An Act to discharge such Recognizances entered into for the Appearance and Prosecution of Offenders, as were forfeited before the Eighteenth Day of January, in the Year One thousand seven hundred and eighty-seven, and for more effectually executing the Green Wax Process.
Corn Trade Act 1791 (repealed)	31 Geo. 3. c. 26 (I)	5 May 1791
An Act to promote a reciprocal Preference between this Kingdom and Great-Britain, in the Corn Trade. (Repealed by Statute Law Revision (Ireland) Act 1879 (42 & 43 Vict. c. 24))
Tanning Act 1791 (repealed)	31 Geo. 3. c. 27 (I)	5 May 1791
An Act to amend an Act passed in the Third Year of His present Majesty, Entitled, "An Act to prevent Frauds in the Tanning of Hides, Currying of Leather, and the making of Shoes and Boots." (Note: Hides, Leather, and Shoes Act 1763 (3 Geo. 3. c. 33 (I))) (Repealed by Statute Law Revision (Ireland) Act 1879 (42 & 43 Vict. c. 24))
Mutiny Act (Ireland) 1791 (repealed)	31 Geo. 3. c. 28 (I)	19 March 1791
An Act for punishing Mutiny and Desertion, and for the better Payment of the Army and their Quarters within this Kingdom. (Repealed by Statute Law Revision (Ireland) Act 1879 (42 & 43 Vict. c. 24))
Salaries of Assistant Barristers Act 1791 (repealed)	31 Geo. 3. c. 29 (I)	5 May 1791
An Act to amend the Laws respecting Assistant Barristers of the Sessions of the Peace. (Repealed by Statute Law Revision (Ireland) Act 1879 (42 & 43 Vict. c. 24))
Trials at Nisi Prius Act 1791 (repealed)	31 Geo. 3. c. 30 (I)	5 May 1791
An Act for explaining and amending an Act, Entitled, "An Act for enlarging the Time for Trials by Nisi Prius in the City of Dublin, and County of Dublin." (Note: Trials at Nisi Prius Act 1781 (21 & 22 Geo. 3. c. 18 (I))) (Repealed by Statute Law Revision (Ireland) Act 1879 (42 & 43 Vict. c. 24))
Civil Bills Decrees Act 1791 (repealed)	31 Geo. 3. c. 31 (I)	5 May 1791
An Act for the preventing of Frauds in the Execution of Decrees obtained on Civil Bills. (Repealed by Civil Bill Courts (Ireland) Act 1851 (14 & 15 Vict. c. 57))
Slander Act 1791 (repealed)	31 Geo. 3. c. 32 (I)	5 May 1791
An Act to prevent Vexatious Arrests and Proceedings in Actions of Slander. (Repealed by Statute Law Revision (Ireland) Act 1879 (42 & 43 Vict. c. 24))
Dublin Coals Price Act 1791	31 Geo. 3. c. 33 (I)	5 May 1791
An Act to prevent the excessive high Price of Coals in the City of Dublin, and for other Purposes therein mentioned.
Apothecaries' Hall Act 1791^{(Republic of Ireland)}	31 Geo. 3. c. 34 (I)	5 May 1791
An Act for the more effectually preserving the Health of His Majesty's Subjects, for erecting an Apothecary's Hall in the City of Dublin, and regulating the Profession of an Apothecary throughout the Kingdom of Ireland.
School of Physic Act 1791	31 Geo. 3. c. 35 (I)	5 May 1791
An Act to explain and amend an Act, Entitled, "An Act for establishing a complete School of Physic in this Kingdom." (Note: (25 Geo. 3. c. 42 (I)))
Parliamentary Election Petitions Act 1791 (repealed)	31 Geo. 3. c. 36 (I)	5 May 1791
An Act to amend and consolidate the several Acts relating to the Trials of Controverted Elections, or Returns of Members to serve in Parliament. (Repealed by Statute Law Revision (Ireland) Act 1879 (42 & 43 Vict. c. 24))
Indemnity Act (Ireland) 1791 (repealed)	31 Geo. 3. c. 37 (I)	5 May 1791
An Act for the Relief of Persons who have omitted to qualify themselves according to Law. (Repealed by Statute Law Revision (Ireland) Act 1879 (42 & 43 Vict. c. 24))
Commons Act 1791^{(Republic of Ireland)}	31 Geo. 3. c. 38 (I)	5 May 1791
An Act to amend an Act, Entitled, "An Act for preventing the Commission of Waste, on the several Commons of this Kingdom." (Note: Commons Act 1789 (29 Geo. 3. c. 30 (I)))
Mines Act 1791 or the Royal Mining Company Act 1791	31 Geo. 3. c. 39 (I)	5 May 1791
An Act for the better enabling certain Persons to open and work Mines, and to raise Coal, Culm, Minerals, and Fossils in this Kingdom.
Landlord and Tenant Act 1791 (repealed)	31 Geo. 3. c. 40 (I)	5 May 1791
An Act for the Preservation of Shrubs and Trees. (Repealed by Landlord and Tenant Law Amendment (Ireland) Act 1860 (23 & 24 Vict. c. 154))
Endowed Schools Commission Continuance Act 1791 (repealed)	31 Geo. 3. c. 41 (I)	5 May 1791
An Act to continue an Act, to continue an Act, (Note: Endowed Schools Commission Continuance Act 1790 (30 Geo. 3. c. 34 (I))) Entitled, "An Act to continue an Act, (Note: Endowed Schools Commission Act 1788 (28 Geo. 3. c. 15 (I))) Entitled, 'An Act to enable the Lord Lieutenant, or other Chief Governor or Governors of this Kingdom, to appoint Commissioners for enquiring into the several Funds and Revenues granted by Public or Private Donations, for the Purposes of Education in this Kingdom, and into the State and Condition of all Schools in this Kingdom on Public or Charitable Foundations, and of the Funds appropriated for the Maintenance and Support thereof, and for the other Purposes herein mentioned. (Repealed by Statute Law Revision (Ireland) Act 1879 (42 & 43 Vict. c. 24))
Grand Canal Act 1791	31 Geo. 3. c. 42 (I)	5 May 1791
An Act for directing the further Application of the Sum of Two Hundred Thousand Pounds, granted by an Act passed in the Twenty-ninth Year of His present Majesty, Entitled, "An Act for the Promotion and Encouragement of Inland Navigation." (Note: Inland Navigation Act 1789 (29 Geo. 3. c. 33 (I)))
Dublin Horse Racing Act 1791 (repealed)	31 Geo. 3. c. 43 (I)	5 May 1791
An Act to prohibit Horse Races in the Neighbourhood of the City of Dublin. (Repealed by Statute Law Revision (Ireland) Act 1879 (42 & 43 Vict. c. 24))
Expiring Laws Continuance Act 1791 (repealed)	31 Geo. 3. c. 44 (I)	5 May 1791
An Act for reviving and continuing several Temporary Statutes. (Repealed by Statute Law Revision (Ireland) Act 1879 (42 & 43 Vict. c. 24))
Merrion Square Act 1791	31 Geo. 3. c. 45 (I)	5 May 1791
An Act for enclosing and improving Merrion-Square, in the City of Dublin.
Armagh Observatory Act 1791	31 Geo. 3. c. 46 (I)	5 May 1791
An Act for settling and preserving a Public Observatory and Museum in the City of Armagh, for ever.
Inland Navigation Act 1791^{(Republic of Ireland)}	31 Geo. 3. c. 47 (I)	5 May 1791
An Act to enable the several Grand Juries within the Province of Munster, at their Assizes, to present competent Sums of Money for the Repair of Trackways along navigable Rivers within their respective Counties, and also to enable the Grand Jury of the County of Kildare, to encrease the Salary of the County Treasurer.
Baronies (Donegal and Meath) Act 1791^{(Republic of Ireland)}	31 Geo. 3. c. 48 (I)	5 May 1791
An Act for the Division of certain Baronies of great Extend in the Counties of Donegal and Meath.
Road in Westmeath Act 1791	31 Geo. 3. c. 49 (I)	19 March 1791
An Act to amend an Act, (Note: Road in Westmeath Act 1790 (30 Geo. 3. c. 46 (I))) for improving the Turnpike Road leading from Kinnegad to Athlone.
Roads in Dublin Act 1791	31 Geo. 3. c. 50 (I)	19 March 1791
An Act for amending the several Laws for making, widening, and repairing the Road from Dublin to Malahide, and the other Roads leading to Dublin over Ballybough-Bridge, in the said Acts mentioned, and for enabling the Trustees for the said Purposes, to borrow further Sums of Money for such Purposes, and for continuing the said Acts for a further Term, and for improving the Neighbourhood of Ballybough-Bridge.
Road from Dublin to Mullingar Act 1791	31 Geo. 3. c. 51 (I)	5 May 1791
An Act to amend the several Acts for Repair of the Road from Dublin to Mullingar.

=== Private acts ===
Short title, or popular name	Citation	Royal assent
Long title
Earl of Louth's Estate Act 1791	31 Geo. 3. c. 1 Pr. (I)	5 May 1791
An Act for vesting certain lands and premises, part of the estate of the Right Honourable Thomas, earl of Louth, in trustees, to be sold for the purposes therein mentioned.
Gardiner's Estate Act 1791	31 Geo. 3. c. 2 Pr. (I)	5 May 1791
An Act to enable the Right Honourable Luke, Lord Baron Mountjoy to make reversionary leases of several parts of the estates in the county and county of the city of Dublin, devised to him by the Right Honourable Luke Gardiner, deceased.
Whitshed Name and Arms Act 1791^{(Republic of Ireland)}	31 Geo. 3. c. 3 Pr. (I)	5 May 1791
An Act for making an exemplification of the last will and testament of James Whitshed, late of Burlington Street in the city of Westminster in the kingdom of Great Britain, esquire, evidence of such will within the kingdom of Ireland, and to enable James Hawkins, now a captain in his majesty's royal navy, to assume the name and bear the arms of Whitshed in addition to his own name.
Phaire's Estate Act 1791	31 Geo. 3. c. 4 Pr. (I)	5 May 1791
An Act to enable the trustees named in the marriage settlement of Robert Phaire of Daphne in the county of Wexford, esquire, effectually to carry into execution the trust in them reposed, and to raise a sufficient sum of money for the purposes therein mentioned.

=== Sources ===
- "Acts of Parliament by Session: 1791". Irish Legislation Database. Queen's University Belfast.
- "Pre-Union Irish Statutes: 1791 Acts". Irish Statute Book. Attorney General of Ireland.

== 32 Geo. 3 (1792) ==
The 3rd session of the 5th parliament of George III, which met from 19 January 1792 to 18 April 1792.

This session was also traditionally cited as 32 G. 3.

=== Public acts ===
Short title, or popular name	Citation	Royal assent
Long title
Trade and Navigation Act 1792 (repealed)	32 Geo. 3. c. 1 (I)	15 March 1792
An Act for granting for one Year the several Duties therein mentioned, in Lieu of all other Duties payable upon the Articles therein specified during the said Term, and for continuing the Effect of a Treaty of Commerce and Navigation between His Majesty and the Most Christian King, (Note: 'Most Christian King' is a reference to the King of France.) and for regulating the Trade between this Kingdom and His Majesty's Colonies, and for other Purposes therein mentioned. (Repealed by Statute Law Revision (Ireland) Act 1879 (42 & 43 Vict. c. 24))
Government Loans and Annuities Act 1792 (repealed)	32 Geo. 3. c. 2 (I)	15 March 1792
An Act for securing the Payment of the Annuities, and of the Interest upon the Principal Sums therein provided for, and towards the Discharge of such Principal Sums in such Manner as therein is directed, and for enabling the Officers of His Majesty's Treasury to receive certain Sums for a limited Time in Manner therein mentioned, and for other Purposes. (Repealed by Statute Law Revision (Ireland) Act 1879 (42 & 43 Vict. c. 24))
Trade with United States Act 1792 (repealed)	32 Geo. 3. c. 3 (I)	15 March 1792
An Act for further continuing an Act, Entitled, "An Act for Facilitating the Trade and Intercourse between this Kingdom and the United States of America." (Note: Trade with United States Act 1788 (28 Geo. 3. c. 18 (I))) (Repealed by Statute Law Revision (Ireland) Act 1879 (42 & 43 Vict. c. 24))
Linen and Hempen Manufacture Act 1792 (repealed)	32 Geo. 3. c. 4 (I)	15 March 1792
An Act for granting the Sum of Four Thousand Pounds to the Trustees of the Linen and Hempen Manufacture, and for other Purposes. (Repealed by Statute Law Revision (Ireland) Act 1879 (42 & 43 Vict. c. 24))
Export Bounties Act 1792 (repealed)	32 Geo. 3. c. 5 (I)	15 March 1792
An Act for regulating the Payment of Bounties on the Exportation of certain Manufactures of this Kingdom. (Repealed by Statute Law Revision (Ireland) Act 1879 (42 & 43 Vict. c. 24))
Charities Grants Act 1792 (repealed)	32 Geo. 3. c. 6 (I)	15 March 1792
An Act for granting the several Sums therein mentioned, for certain Pious and Charitable Purposes. (Repealed by Statute Law Revision (Ireland) Act 1879 (42 & 43 Vict. c. 24))
Tobacco Trade Regulation Act 1792 (repealed)	32 Geo. 3. c. 7 (I)	15 March 1792
An Act for regulating and extending the Tobacco Trade. (Repealed by Statute Law Revision (Ireland) Act 1879 (42 & 43 Vict. c. 24))
Stamp Duties Act 1792 (repealed)	32 Geo. 3. c. 8 (I)	15 March 1792
An Act for granting to His Majesty, His Heirs and Successors, several Duties therein mentioned, to be levied by the Commissioners for managing the Stamp Duties. (Repealed by Statute Law Revision (Ireland) Act 1879 (42 & 43 Vict. c. 24))
Mutiny Act (Ireland) 1792 (repealed)	32 Geo. 3. c. 9 (I)	15 March 1792
An Act for punishing Mutiny and Desertion, and for the better Payment of the Army and their Quarters within this Kingdom. (Repealed by Statute Law Revision (Ireland) Act 1879 (42 & 43 Vict. c. 24))
Postage Act 1792 (repealed)	32 Geo. 3. c. 10 (I)	15 March 1792
An Act for granting to His Majesty, His Heirs and Successors, certain Duties and Rates upon the Portage and Conveyance of all Letters and Packets within this Kingdom. (Repealed by Statute Law Revision (Ireland) Act 1879 (42 & 43 Vict. c. 24))
Lotteries Act 1792	32 Geo. 3. c. 11 (I)	18 April 1792
An Act to amend the Laws for the Sale and Insurance of Lottery Tickets.
Deeds of Trust Act 1792	32 Geo. 3. c. 12 (I)	18 April 1792
An Act to explain the Trusts for which certain Rectories Impropriate, and Tithes forfeited, by Reason of the Rebellion in this Kingdom in the Year One thousand six hundred and eighty-eight, were conveyed to certain Trustees nominated by the several Bishops in whose Dioceses such Rectories Impropriate, and Tithes are situated.
Erne Navigation Act 1792^{(Republic of Ireland)}	32 Geo. 3. c. 13 (I)	18 April 1792
An Act to explain and amend an Act passed in the Twenty-ninth Year of His Majesty’s Reign, Entitled, "An Act for the Promotion and Encouragement of Inland Navigation," (Note: Inland Navigation Act 1789 (29 Geo. 3. c. 33 (I))) so for only as respects the Navigation from Belturbet, by Lough-Erne to the Sea, and to constitute certain persons therein named, a Corporation for the Purpose of carrying on and completing said Navigation.
Dublin Society Act 1792	32 Geo. 3. c. 14 (I)	18 April 1792
An Act for granting the Sum of Five Thousand Pounds to the Dublin Society, for the Purposes therein mentioned.
Inland Navigation Act 1792	32 Geo. 3. c. 15 (I)	18 April 1792
An Act to explain and amend certain Laws relative to Inland Navigations of this Kingdom. (Repealed for the Republic of Ireland by Statute Law Revision (Pre-Union Irish Statutes) Act 1962 (No. 29))
Criminal Law Act 1792	32 Geo. 3. c. 16 (I)	18 April 1792
An Act for regulating the Office of Constable, and for better enforcing the Process of the criminal Law in certain Parts of this Kingdom.
Revenue Act 1792 (repealed)	32 Geo. 3. c. 17 (I)	18 April 1792
An Act for continuing and amending several Laws relating to His Majesty's Revenue, and for more effectually preventing Frauds therein. (Repealed by Statute Law Revision (Ireland) Act 1879 (42 & 43 Vict. c. 24))
King's Inns Act 1792 (repealed)	32 Geo. 3. c. 18 (I)	18 April 1792
An Act for confirming the Powers of the Society of King's-Inns, Dublin, and to repeal an Act, Entitled, "An Act to regulate the Admission of Barristers at Law." (Note: Barristers Admission Act 1781 (21 & 22 Geo. 3. c. 32 (I))) (Repealed by Statute Law Revision (Ireland) Act 1879 (42 & 43 Vict. c. 24))
Spirit Licences Act 1799 (repealed)	32 Geo. 3. c. 19 (I)	18 April 1792
An Act for continuing and amending an Act, Entitled, "An Act for regulating the issuing of Licenses for the Sale of Spiritous Liquors by Retail, and for remedying the Abuses which have arisen from the immoderate Use of Such Liquors." (Note: Spirit Licences Act 1791 (31 Geo. 3. c. 13 (I))) (Repealed by Statute Law Revision (Ireland) Act 1879 (42 & 43 Vict. c. 24))
Corn Trade Act 1792 (repealed)	32 Geo. 3. c. 20 (I)	15 March 1792
An Act for the Encrease of Agriculture and Commerce, by establishing a reciprocal Preference in the Corn Trade between this Kingdom and Great Britain. (Repealed by Statute Law Revision (Ireland) Act 1879 (42 & 43 Vict. c. 24))
Roman Catholic Relief (Repeals) Act 1792 or the Roman Catholic Relief Act 1792 (repealed)	32 Geo. 3. c. 21 (I)	18 April 1792
An Act to remove certain Restraints and Disabilities therein mentioned, to which His Majesty's Subjects professing the Popish Religion are now subject. (Repealed by Statute Law Revision (Ireland) Act 1879 (42 & 43 Vict. c. 24))
Roman Catholic Relief (Indemnity) Act 1792 (repealed)	32 Geo. 3. c. 22 (I)	18 April 1792
An Act to indemnify such of His Majesty's Subjects professing the Popish Religion, as have omitted to take and subscribe the Oath and Declaration mentioned in an Act passed in the Thirteenth and Fourteenth Years of the Reign of His present Majesty, Entitled, "An Act to enable His Majesty's Subjects of whatsoever Persuasion, to testify their Allegiance to Him," (Note: Roman Catholic Relief Act 1773 (13 & 14 Geo. 3. c. 35 (I))) and to enable such Persons to take and subscribe such Oath and Declaration at any Time before the First of November next. (Repealed by Statute Law Revision (Ireland) Act 1879 (42 & 43 Vict. c. 24))
Sea Fisheries Act 1792 (repealed)	32 Geo. 3. c. 23 (I)	18 April 1792
An Act for the further Encouragement of the Fisheries on the Coasts of this Kingdom. (Repealed by Statute Law Revision (Ireland) Act 1879 (42 & 43 Vict. c. 24))
Hibernian Mine Company Act 1792	32 Geo. 3. c. 24 (I)	18 April 1792
An Act for the better enabling certain Persons to open and work Mines, and to raise Coal, Culm, Minerals and Fossils in this Kingdom, and to open and improve the Harbour of Arklow, in the County of Wicklow, and to form a Canal from the said Harbour of Arklow, to the Meetings-Bridge, and to extend the same towards the Kilkenny Collieries, and the Glenmalur Mines.
Forfeited Recognizances Act 1792	32 Geo. 3. c. 25 (I)	18 April 1792
An Act to explain, amend, and render more effectual an Act passed in the Twenty-seventh Year of His Majesty's Reign, Entitled, "An Act for the better Collection of His Majesty's Revenue arising from Forfeited Recognizances," (Note: Forfeited Recognizances Act 1787 (27 Geo. 3. c. 32 (I))) as also an Act passed in the Twenty-ninth Year of His Majesty's Reign, (Note: Forfeited Recognizances Act 1789 (29 Geo. 3. c. 28 (I))) Entitled, "An Act to amend an Act passed in the Twenty-seventh Year of His Majesty's Reign, Entitled, 'An Act for the better Collection of His Majesty's Revenue arising from Forfeited Recognizances,'" and to extend the Provisions thereof, and for enlarging the Time for John Howard Kyan, Esquire, to account pursuant to his Recognizance.
Royal Canal Docks Act 1792	32 Geo. 3. c. 26 (I)	18 April 1792
An Act for enabling the Royal Canal Company to make Docks on the North Side of the River Liffey, under certain Conditions.
Hard Labour (Transportation) Act 1792 (repealed)	32 Geo. 3. c. 27 (I)	18 April 1792
An Act for the employing at Hard Labour Persons sentenced to be Transported. (Repealed by Statute Law Revision (Ireland) Act 1879 (42 & 43 Vict. c. 24))
New Churches Building Act 1792 (repealed)	32 Geo. 3. c. 28 (I)	18 April 1792
An Act further to promote the building of new Churches. (Repealed by Statute Law Revision (Ireland) Act 1879 (42 & 43 Vict. c. 24))
Tolls Act 1792^{(Republic of Ireland)}	32 Geo. 3. c. 29 (I)	18 April 1792
An Act to prevent Abuses in the Collection of Tolls.
Post Roads Act 1792 (repealed)	32 Geo. 3. c. 30 (I)	18 April 1792
An Act for improving and keeping in Repair the Post Roads of this Kingdom. (Repealed by Statute Law Revision (Ireland) Act 1879 (42 & 43 Vict. c. 24))
Mortmain Act 1792	32 Geo. 3. c. 31 (I)	18 April 1792
An Act to empower His Majesty to grant Licenses to alien Lands in Mortmain.
Aliens Mortgage Act 1792 (repealed)	32 Geo. 3. c. 32 (I)	18 April 1792
An Act to enable Aliens born out of the Allegiance of His Majesty, His Heirs and Successors, to take Lands, Tenements, and Hereditaments in this Kingdom, by Way of Mortgage, subject to certain Restrictions. (Repealed by Statute Law Revision (Ireland) Act 1879 (42 & 43 Vict. c. 24))
Indemnity Act (Ireland) 1792 (repealed)	32 Geo. 3. c. 33 (I)	18 April 1792
An Act for the Relief of Persons who have omitted to qualify themselves according to Law. (Repealed by Statute Law Revision (Ireland) Act 1879 (42 & 43 Vict. c. 24))
Estate of the Bishop of Cork Act 1792	32 Geo. 3. c. 34 (I)	18 April 1792
An Act to explain and amend an Act made in this Kingdom, in the Eighth Year of the Reign of King George the First, (Note: Glebe Exchange Act 1721 (8 Geo. 1. c. 11 (I))) Entitled, "An Act for the supplying a Defect in an Act passed in the Second Year of the Reign of Her late Majesty Queen Anne, (Note: Glebe Exchange Act 1704 (2 Anne c. 10 (I))) Entitled, 'An Act for the Exchange of Glebes belonging to Churches in this Kingdom.'"
City of Dublin Act 1792^{(Republic of Ireland)}	32 Geo. 3. c. 35 (I)	18 April 1792
An Act for repairing and preserving the Walls of the River Anna Liffey, in the City of Dublin, and for amending an Act passed in the Twenty-sixth Year of His Majesty's Reign, Entitled, "An Act for promoting the Trade of Dublin, by rendering in Port and Harbour more commodious." (Note: Dublin Port Act 1786 (26 Geo. 3. c. 19 (I)))
Kinnegad to Athlone Road Act 1792	32 Geo. 3. c. 36 (I)	18 April 1792
An Act to amend an Act made in the Thirtieth Year of His present Majesty, Entitled, "An Act for improving and repairing the Turnpike Road leading from Kinnegad to Athlone." (Note: Road in Westmeath Act 1790 (30 Geo. 3. c. 46 (I)))
Dublin to Malahide Road Act 1792	32 Geo. 3. c. 37 (I)	18 April 1792
An Act for enabling the Trustees for making, widening, and repairing the Road from Dublin to Malahide, and the other Roads leading to Dublin over Ballybough-Bridge, pursuant to several Acts of Parliament, more effectually to carry the said Acts into Execution.
Road in the Queen's County Act 1792	32 Geo. 3. c. 38 (I)	18 April 1792
An Act to amend an Act, Entitled, "An Act for repairing the Road leading from the Town of Maryborough, in the Queen's-County, through the Towns of Mountrath, Castletown, and Borris in Offory, in the same County, and from thence through the Town of Roscrea, in the County of Tipperary, and through the Town of Dunkerrin, in the King's-County, to the Town of Tomivarah, in the said County of Tipperary.
Kilkenny to Clogheen Road Act 1792	32 Geo. 3. c. 39 (I)	18 April 1792
An Act to explain and amend the several Laws for repairing and amending the Turnpike Road leading from Kilkenny to Clogheen.
Expiring Laws Continuance Act 1792	32 Geo. 3. c. 40 (I)	18 April 1792
An Act for reviving and continuing certain Temporary Statutes.
Creditors of Robert Brook Act 1792	32 Geo. 3. c. 41 (I)	18 April 1792
An Act for the Relief of the Creditors of Robert Brook, late of Prosperous, in the County of Kildare, Esquire.

=== Private acts ===
Short title, or popular name	Citation	Royal assent
Long title
Dublin Cathedral Estate Act 1792	32 Geo. 3. c. 1 Pr. (I)	18 April 1792
An Act to enable the dean of the cathedral church of the Holy and Undivided Trinity in Dublin to demise part of his mensal lands.

=== Sources ===
- "Acts of Parliament by Session: 1792". Irish Legislation Database. Queen's University Belfast.
- "Pre-Union Irish Statutes: 1792 Acts". Irish Statute Book. Attorney General of Ireland.

== 33 Geo. 3 (1793) ==
The 4th session of the 5th parliament of George III, which met from 10 January 1793 to 16 August 1793.

This session was also traditionally cited as 33 G. 3.

=== Public acts ===
Short title, or popular name	Citation	Royal assent
Long title
Alien Act 1793 (repealed)	33 Geo. 3. c. 1 (I)	31 January 1793
An Act for establishing Regulations respecting Aliens arriving in this Kingdom, or resident therein, in certain Cases, and Subjects of this Kingdom, who have served, or are serving in Foreign Armies. (Repealed by Statute Law Revision (Ireland) Act 1879 (42 & 43 Vict. c. 24))
Gunpowder Act 1793 (repealed)	33 Geo. 3. c. 2 (I)	25 February 1793
An Act to prevent the Importation of Arms, Gunpowder, and Ammunition into this Kingdom; and the removing and keeping of Gunpowder, Arms, and Ammunition, without License. (Repealed by Statute Law Revision (Ireland) Act 1879 (42 & 43 Vict. c. 24))
Indemnity Act (Ireland) 1793 (repealed)	33 Geo. 3. c. 3 (I)	25 February 1793
An Act for indemnifying such Persons as have acted for the Service of the public, in advising or carrying into Execution Three several Proclamations of the Lord Lieutenant and Council of this Kingdom, bearing Date the Twenty-sixth Day of December, One thousand seven hundred and ninety-two, and the Seventeenth Day of January, One thousand seven hundred and ninety-three respectively, and for establishing certain Bonds therein mentioned. (Repealed by Statute Law Revision (Ireland) Act 1879 (42 & 43 Vict. c. 24))
Duties and Trade Regulation Act 1793 (repealed)	33 Geo. 3. c. 4 (I)	23 March 1793
An Act for granting for one Year the several Duties therein mentioned, in Lieu of all other Duties payable upon the Articles therein specified during the said Term, and for continuing the Effect of the Treaty of Commerce and Navigation signed at Versailles on the Twenty-sixth Day of September, One thousand seven hundred and eighty-six, between His Majesty and the Most Christian King, (Note: 'Most Christian King' is a reference to the King of France.) and for regulating the Trade between this Kingdom and His Majesty's Colonies, and for other Purposes therein mentioned. (Repealed by Statute Law Revision (Ireland) Act 1879 (42 & 43 Vict. c. 24))
Loan and Annuities Act 1793 (repealed)	33 Geo. 3. c. 5 (I)	23 March 1793
An Act for securing the Payment of the Annuities, and of the Interest upon the Principal Sums therein provided for, and towards the Discharge of such Principal Sums in such Manner as therein is directed, and for enabling the Officers of His Majesty's Treasury to receive certain Sums for a limited Time in Manner therein mentioned, and for other Purposes. (Repealed by Statute Law Revision (Ireland) Act 1879 (42 & 43 Vict. c. 24))
Sugar Drawback and Bounty Act 1793 (repealed)	33 Geo. 3. c. 6 (I)	23 March 1793
An Act for regulating the Allowance of the Drawback, and Payment of the Bounty on the Exportation of Sugar. (Repealed by Statute Law Revision (Ireland) Act 1879 (42 & 43 Vict. c. 24))
Trade with United States Act 1793 (repealed)	33 Geo. 3. c. 7 (I)	23 March 1793
An Act for further continuing an Act, Entitled, "An Act for facilitating the Trade and Intercourse between this Kingdom and the United States of America." (Note: Trade with United States Act 1788 (28 Geo. 3. c. 18 (I))) (Repealed by Statute Law Revision (Ireland) Act 1879 (42 & 43 Vict. c. 24))
Export Bounties Act 1793 (repealed)	33 Geo. 3. c. 8 (I)	23 March 1793
An Act for regulating the Payment of Bounties on the Exportation of certain Manufactures of this Kingdom. (Repealed by Statute Law Revision (Ireland) Act 1879 (42 & 43 Vict. c. 24))
Charities Grants Act 1793 (repealed)	33 Geo. 3. c. 9 (I)	23 March 1793
An Act for granting the several Sums therein mentioned, for certain Pious and Charitable Purposes. (Repealed by Statute Law Revision (Ireland) Act 1879 (42 & 43 Vict. c. 24))
Newry Navigation Act 1793	33 Geo. 3. c. 10 (I)	9 April 1793
An Act for confirming, amending, and enlarging the Powers vested in the Corporation for promoting and carrying on the Newry Navigation.
Tobacco Act 1793 (repealed)	33 Geo. 3. c. 11 (I)	23 March 1793
An Act for regulating and extending the Tobacco Trade. (Repealed by Statute Law Revision (Ireland) Act 1879 (42 & 43 Vict. c. 24))
Linen and Hempen Manufactures Grant Act 1793	33 Geo. 3. c. 12 (I)	9 April 1793
An Act for granting the Sum of Four Thousand Pounds to the Trustees of the Linen and Hempen Manufactures, and for other Purposes.
Dublin Society Act 1793	33 Geo. 3. c. 13 (I)	9 April 1793
An Act for granting the Sum of Five Thousand Pounds to the Dublin Society, for the Purposes therein mentioned.
Fire Hearths Duty Act 1793 (repealed)	33 Geo. 3. c. 14 (I)	9 April 1793
An Act for granting to His Majesty, for one Year, the Duties therein mentioned on Fire Hearths, in Lieu of all Duties payable on the same, prior to, or during the said Term. (Repealed by Statute Law Revision (Ireland) Act 1879 (42 & 43 Vict. c. 24))
Stamp Duties Act 1793 (repealed)	33 Geo. 3. c. 15 (I)	23 March 1793
An Act for granting to His Majesty, His Heirs and Successors, several Duties therein mentioned, to be levied by the Commissioners for managing the Stamp Duties. (Repealed by Statute Law Revision (Ireland) Act 1879 (42 & 43 Vict. c. 24))
Mutiny Act (Ireland) 1793 (repealed)	33 Geo. 3. c. 16 (I)	23 March 1793
An Act for punishing Mutiny and Desertion, and for the better Payment of the Army and their Quarters within this Kingdom. (Repealed by Statute Law Revision (Ireland) Act 1879 (42 & 43 Vict. c. 24))
Postage Duties Act 1793 (repealed)	33 Geo. 3. c. 17 (I)	23 March 1793
An Act for granting to His Majesty, His Heirs and Successors, certain Duties and Rates upon the Portage and Conveyance of all Letters and Packets within this Kingdom. (Repealed by Statute Law Revision (Ireland) Act 1879 (42 & 43 Vict. c. 24))
Lotteries Act 1793	33 Geo. 3. c. 18 (I)	9 April 1793
An Act to prevent Insurance of Lottery Tickets, to regulate the Drawing of Lotteries, and to amend the Laws respecting the same.
Castlecomer and Kilkenny Road Act 1793	33 Geo. 3. c. 19 (I)	23 March 1793
An Act for repairing the Road leading from the Town of Castlecomer, in the County of Kilkenny, to the City of Kilkenny.
Newcastle, Limerick, and Cork Road Act 1793	33 Geo. 3. c. 20 (I)	9 April 1793
An Act for continuing and amending the several Acts, for making, widening, and repairing the Road leading from the Town of Newcastle, in the County of Limerick, to the City of Limerick, and from thence to the Bounds of the Counties of Limerick and Cork, between the Towns of Killmallock and Charleville, and to continue an Act passed in the Twenty-eighth Year of His present Majesty, (Note: Newcastle, Limerick, and Cork Road Act 1788 (28 Geo. 3. c. 28 (I))) Entitled, "An Act to continue and amend an Act passed in the Fifth Year of His late Majesty's Reign, (Note: Newcastle, Limerick, and Cork Road Act 1731 (5 Geo. 2. c. 22 (I))) Entitled, 'An Act for repairing the Road leading from the Town of Newcastle in the County of Limerick, to the City of Limerick, and from thence to the City of Cork.'"
Roman Catholic Relief Act 1793	33 Geo. 3. c. 21 (I)	9 April 1793
An Act for the relief of his majesty's Roman Catholic subjects of Ireland.
Militia Act (Ireland) 1793 (repealed)	33 Geo. 3. c. 22 (I)	9 April 1793
An Act for amending and reducing into one Act of Parliament, the Laws relating to the Militia in Ireland. (Repealed by Militia (Ireland) Act 1809 (49 Geo. 3. c. 120))
Seamen's Wages Remittance Act 1793 (repealed)	33 Geo. 3. c. 23 (I)	23 March 1793
An Act for the Encouragement of Seamen and Marines employed in the Royal Navy, by rendering it more easy to Petty Officers and Seamen, Non-commissioned Officers of Marines, and Marines, to remit their Wages to this Kingdom, and by providing for the Payment in this Kingdom, of Wages due to deceased Officers, Seamen, and Marines, as aforesaid. (Repealed by Statute Law Revision (Ireland) Act 1879 (42 & 43 Vict. c. 24))
Dublin Baking Trade Act 1793	33 Geo. 3. c. 24 (I)	3 June 1793
An Act for the Relief of Persons carrying on the Baking Trade in the City of Dublin.
Barren Land Improvement Act 1793 (repealed)	33 Geo. 3. c. 25 (I)	3 June 1793
An Act to encourage the Improvement of Barren Land. (Repealed by Statute Law Revision (Ireland) Act 1879 (42 & 43 Vict. c. 24))
Dublin and Malahide Road Act 1793	33 Geo. 3. c. 26 (I)	3 June 1793
An Act for further amending the several Laws for making, widening, and repairing the Road from Dublin to Malahide, and the other Roads leading to Dublin over Ballybough-Bridge, and for enabling the Trustees for the said Purposes, to borrow a further Sum to complete a new Communication Eastward of Ballybough-Bridge.
Morgan's Charity Act 1793	33 Geo. 3. c. 27 (I)	3 June 1793
An Act for confirming and establishing certain Articles of Agreement made between the Trustees named and appointed by the last Will and Testament of Richard Morgan, late of Newcastle, in the County of Dublin, Esquire, deceased, and John Godley, of the City of Dublin, Esquire, the Nephew and Heir at Law of the said Richard Morgan, concerning the real and personal Estates whereof the said Richard Morgan died seized and possessed, and for other Purposes.
Militia Families Act 1793	33 Geo. 3. c. 28 (I)	16 August 1793
An Act to provide for the Families of Persons chosen by Lot to serve in the Militia of this Kingdom.
Convention Act 1793	33 Geo. 3. c. 29 (I)	16 August 1793
An Act to prevent the Election or Appointment of unlawful Assemblies, under Pretence of preparing or presenting public Petitions, or other Addresses to His Majesty, or the Parliament.
Traitorous Correspondence Act 1793 (repealed)	33 Geo. 3. c. 30 (I)	16 August 1793
An Act more effectually to prevent, during the present War between Great Britain and France, all traiterous Correspondence with, or Aid, or Assistance being given to His Majesty's Enemies. (Repealed by Statute Law Revision (Ireland) Act 1879 (42 & 43 Vict. c. 24))
Trade between Ireland and East Indies Act 1793 (repealed)	33 Geo. 3. c. 31 (I)	16 August 1793
An Act for regulating the Trade of Ireland, to and from the East Indies, under certain Conditions and Provisions, for a Time therein mentioned. (Repealed by Statute Law Revision (Ireland) Act 1879 (42 & 43 Vict. c. 24))
Roads in Queen's County, &c. Act 1793	33 Geo. 3. c. 32 (I)	16 August 1793
An Act to explain and reduce into One Act, the several Laws for making, repairing, or amending the Turnpike Roads leading from the Town of Naas, to the Towns of Maryborough and Ballyroan, from the said Town of Maryborough, to the City of Limerick, and from the Town of Nenagh, to O'Brien's Bridge.
Militia Pay and Clothing Act 1793 (repealed)	33 Geo. 3. c. 33 (I)	16 August 1793
An Act for defraying the Charge of the Pay and Clothing of the Militia for one Year, from the Twenty-fifth of March, One thousand seven hundred and ninety-three, and for the more easily raising of the same. (Repealed by Statute Law Revision (Ireland) Act 1879 (42 & 43 Vict. c. 24))
Civil List Act 1793	33 Geo. 3. c. 34 (I)	16 August 1793
An Act for the Support of the Honour and Dignity of His Majesty's Crown in Ireland, and for granting to His Majesty a Civil List Establishment, under certain Provisions and Regulations. (Repealed for the Republic of Ireland by Statute Law Revision (Pre-Union Irish Statutes) Act 1962 (No. 29))
Dublin Marshalsea Act 1793 (repealed)	33 Geo. 3. c. 35 (I)	16 August 1793
An Act for the better Regulation of the Marshalsea of the Four Courts in Dublin. (Repealed by Prisons (Ireland) Act 1810 (50 Geo. 3. c. 103))
Spirit Licences Act 1793 (repealed)	33 Geo. 3. c. 36 (I)	16 August 1793
An Act for continuing the Duties granted to His Majesty on Licenses for the Retail of Spirituous Liquors, and for continuing the Regulations for issuing such Licenses, and for remedying the Abuses which have arisen from the immoderate Use of such Liquors. (Repealed by Statute Law Revision (Ireland) Act 1879 (42 & 43 Vict. c. 24))
Revenue Laws Act 1793 (repealed)	33 Geo. 3. c. 37 (I)	16 August 1793
An Act for continuing and amending the several Laws relating to His Majesty's Revenue, and for more effectually preventing Frauds therein. (Repealed by Statute Law Revision (Ireland) Act 1879 (42 & 43 Vict. c. 24))
Mandamus (Freemen) Act 1793 (repealed)	33 Geo. 3. c. 38 (I)	16 August 1793
An Act for giving Relief in Proceedings upon Writs of Mandamus, for the Admission of Freemen into Corporations. (Repealed by Statute Law Revision (Ireland) Act 1879 (42 & 43 Vict. c. 24))
Treasury Bills Act 1793 (repealed)	33 Geo. 3. c. 39 (I)	16 August 1793
An Act to enable his Excellency the Lord Lieutenant, to issue Treasury Bills, for raising the Sum of Three Hundred Thousand Pounds. (Repealed by Statute Law Revision (Ireland) Act 1879 (42 & 43 Vict. c. 24))
Dublin Coal Price Act 1793	33 Geo. 3. c. 40 (I)	16 August 1793
An Act to prevent the excessive Price of Coals in the City of Dublin, and for encouraging the Storing thereof.
House of Commons Disqualification Act 1793 (repealed)	33 Geo. 3. c. 41 (I)	16 August 1793
An Act for securing the Freedom and Independence of the House of Commons, by excluding therefrom Persons holding any Offices under the Crown, to be hereafter created, or holding certain Offices therein enumerated, or Pensions for Terms of Years, or during His Majesty's Pleasure. (Repealed for the Republic of Ireland by Statute Law Revision (Pre-Union Irish Statutes) Act 1962 (No. 29) and for Northern Ireland by Statute Law (Repeals) Act 1981 (c. 19))
Relief of Insolvent Debtors Act 1793 (repealed)	33 Geo. 3. c. 42 (I)	16 August 1793
An Act for the Relief of Insolvent Debtors, in Regard to the Imprisonment of their Persons. (Repealed by Statute Law Revision (Ireland) Act 1879 (42 & 43 Vict. c. 24))
Libel Act 1793	33 Geo. 3. c. 43 (I)	16 August 1793
An Act to remove Doubts respecting the Functions of Juries in Cases of Libel.
King's Inns Act 1793 (repealed)	33 Geo. 3. c. 44 (I)	16 August 1793
An Act to repeal so much of an Act passed in the Thirty-second Years of His Majesty, (Note: King's Inns Act 1792 (32 Geo. 3. c. 18 (I))) Entitled, "An Act for confirming the Powers of the Society of King's-Inns, Dublin, and to repeal an Act, (Note: (21 & 22 Geo. 3. c. 32 (I))) Entitled, 'An Act to regulate the Admission of Barristers at Law,'" as confirms the Charter of the said Society. (Repealed by Statute Law Revision (Ireland) Act 1879 (42 & 43 Vict. c. 24))
Treason Act 1793	33 Geo. 3. c. 45 (I)	16 August 1793
An Act for the Trial of Treason committed out of the King's Dominions. (Repealed for the Republic of Ireland by Statute Law Revision (Pre-Union Irish Statutes) Act 1962 (No. 29))
Post Roads Act 1793 (repealed)	33 Geo. 3. c. 46 (I)	16 August 1793
An Act to amend and explain an Act passed in the Thirty-second Year of His present Majesty's Reign, Entitled, "An Act for improving and keeping in Repair the Post Roads of this Kingdom." (Note: Post Roads Act 1792 (32 Geo. 3. c. 30 (I))) (Repealed by Statute Law Revision (Ireland) Act 1879 (42 & 43 Vict. c. 24))
Cork Coal Price Act 1793	33 Geo. 3. c. 47 (I)	16 August 1793
An Act for the further regulating the Price at which Coals shall be purchased, for the Supply of the Public Coal Yards in the City of Cork, and sold out of the same.
Forfeited Tithes Act 1793	33 Geo. 3. c. 48 (I)	16 August 1793
An Act to explain and amend an Act passed in the last Session of Parliament, Entitled, "An Act to explain the Trusts for which certain Rectories Impropriate, and Tithes forfeited by Reason of the Rebellion in this Kingdom, in the Year One thousand six hundred and eighty-eight, were conveyed to certain Trustees nominated by the several Bishops in whose Dioceses such Rectories Impropriate and Tithes are situated." (Note: Deeds of Trust Act 1792 (32 Geo. 3. c. 12 (I)))
Forfeited Estates Act 1793 (repealed)	33 Geo. 3. c. 49 (I)	16 August 1793
An Act for re-vesting in His Majesty the Estates forfeited in One thousand six hundred and eighty-eight, yet remaining unsold. (Repealed by Statute Law Revision (Ireland) Act 1879 (42 & 43 Vict. c. 24))
Fisheries Act 1793 (repealed)	33 Geo. 3. c. 50 (I)	16 August 1793
An Act for the Encouragement of the Fisheries in this Kingdom, and for continuing certain Acts respecting the same. (Repealed by Fisheries (Ireland) Act 1842 (5 & 6 Vict. c. 106))
Sacramental Test Act 1793	33 Geo. 3. c. 51 (I)	16 August 1793
An Act to remove some Doubts respecting Persons in Office taking the Sacramental Test.
Commercial Credit Act 1793 (repealed)	33 Geo. 3. c. 52 (I)	16 August 1793
An Act for the Advancement of Trade and Manufactures, by granting the Sums therein mentioned, for the Support of Commercial Credit. (Repealed by Statute Law Revision (Ireland) Act 1879 (42 & 43 Vict. c. 24))
St. George's Parish Act 1793^{(Republic of Ireland)}	33 Geo. 3. c. 53 (I)	16 August 1793
An Act for making and constituting a new Parish, by the Name of the Parish of Saint George, on the Ground adjoining the City of Dublin therein described, and for erecting and building a Parish Church therein.
City of Dublin Act 1793	33 Geo. 3. c. 54 (I)	16 August 1793
An Act for amending an Act, (Note: City of Dublin Act 1792 (32 Geo. 3. c. 35 (I))) Entitled, "An Act for repairing and preserving the Walls of the River Anna Liffey, in the City of Dublin, and for amending an Act passed in the Twenty-sixth Year of His Majesty's Reign, (Note: Dublin Port Act 1786 (26 Geo. 3. c. 19 (I))) Entitled, 'An Act for promoting the Trade of Dublin by rendering its Port and Harbour more commodious.'"
Marine Mutiny Act (Ireland) 1793 (repealed)	33 Geo. 3. c. 55 (I)	16 August 1793
An Act for the Regulation of His Majesty's Marine Forces, while on Shore. (Repealed by Statute Law Revision (Ireland) Act 1879 (42 & 43 Vict. c. 24))
Dublin Grand Jury Presentments Act 1793	33 Geo. 3. c. 56 (I)	16 August 1793
An Act respecting the Collection of Publick Money, to be levied in the County of the City of Dublin, by Presentment.

=== Private acts ===
Short title, or popular name	Citation	Royal assent
Long title
Lord Belmore's Divorce Act 1793	33 Geo. 3. c. 1 Pr. (I)	9 April 1793
An Act to dissolve the marriage of Armar Lowry, Lord Viscount Belmore, with Henrietta, Lady Viscountess Belmore, his now wife, and to enable him to marry again.
Cockburne's Estate Act 1793	33 Geo. 3. c. 2 Pr. (I)	9 April 1793
An Act to confirm and establish an agreement of compromise between George Cockburne and John Hussey, esquires, touching the lordships, manors, towns and lands of Rathkenny, Drominstown, otherwise Drumstown, Milltown and Clogher, with their and every of their appurtenances, and also the towns and lands of Galtrim, Boyestown, Rathgowney, other wise Rathgownly, Gallstown, Kenraghstown, Baltrasna, Lennanstown, otherwise Lynanstown, Hanyestown, Ryanhunt, otherwise Raheenhunt and Cowaghstown, with their and every of their appurtenances, and to extinguish the claim of George Cockburne, and all other persons whatsoever in or to the said lands, claiming by, from or under George Cockburne, late of the city of Dublin, esquire, deceased.
Duchess of Chandos's Estate Act (Ireland) 1793	33 Geo. 3. c. 3 Pr. (I)	16 August 1793
An Act to carry into effect an agreement entered into between the most noble Anna Eliza, duchess dowager of Chandos, and the Right Honourable Lady Anna Eliza Brydges, and James Stephens Brownlow, George Despard, Caleb Carden and William Carden, esquires, concerning the manor and estate of Villers in the barony of Upper Ossory in the Queen's County, and for other purposes.
Malone's Estate Act 1793	33 Geo. 3. c. 4 Pr. (I)	16 August 1793
An Act for vesting certain parts of the estates of Edmond Malone of Ballynahown in the county of Westmeath, esquire, in trustees for the payment of debts, and for other purposes.
Coates' Estate Act 1793	33 Geo. 3. c. 5 Pr. (I)	16 August 1793
An Act to enable John Dawson Coates of the city of Dublin, esquire, and his daughters Elizabeth Duckett and Anna Hutchinson, to make leases under certain restrictions of certain estates and lands situate in the counties of Dublin and Meath and county of the city of Dublin, and comprised in and settled by a certain settlement made the 8th day of October in the year 1791.
Finucane's Divorce Act 1793 (repealed)	33 Geo. 3. c. 6 Pr. (I)	16 August 1793
An Act to dissolve the marriage of Mathias Finucane, esquire, with Anne Finucane, otherwise O'Brien, his now wife, and to enable him to marry again, and for other purposes therein mentioned. (Repealed by Statute Law Revision Act 2012 (No 19))
Earl of Shelburne's Estate Act 1793	33 Geo. 3. c. 7 Pr. (I)	16 August 1793
An Act for settling to certain uses a part of the real estate devised and directed to be purchased by the will of Henry, earl of Shelburne, deceased, freed from certain uses declared thereof by his will, and by an act of parliament of Great Britain, entitled, "An Act for vesting part of the real estate devised and directed to be purchased by the will of Henry earl of Shelburne in the kingdom of Ireland and in Token House Yard London, in trustees, to be sold or mortgaged, and for laying out the money arising by such sale or mortgage thereof, in the purchase of manors, lands or hereditaments in England, to be settled to the uses of his said will," (Note: Earl of Shelburne's Estate Act 1769 (9 Geo. 3. c. 59 Pr. (GB))) and for enabling the persons therein mentioned to grant such leases as are therein expressed.
Tuthill's Estate Act 1793	33 Geo. 3. c. 8 Pr. (I)	16 August 1793
An Act for vesting certain lands, tenements and hereditaments in the county of Limerick and county of the city of Limerick, part of the settled estate of John Tuthill of the city of Limerick, esquire, in trustees, in order by sale or mortgage of a competent part thereof to raise and pay the sum of £6,000 the portions of the younger children of the said John Tuthill by Elizabeth Tuthill, otherwise Jackson, his wife, and also the sum of £1,333 6s. 8d., part of the portion of Anne Minnitt, otherwise Tuthill, sister of the said John Tuthill, and that such part of said lands and premises as shall remain unsold for the purposes aforesaid may be and remain to the said John Tuthill, his heirs and assigns, in lieu and satisfaction of a sum of £5,500 due to the said John Tuthill, and which said sums of £6,000, £1,333 6s. 8d., and £5,500 are charges affecting the settled estate of the said John Tuthill.

=== Sources ===
- "Acts of Parliament by Session: 1793". Irish Legislation Database. Queen's University Belfast.

== 34 Geo. 3 (1794) ==
The 5th session of the 5th parliament of George III, which met from 21 January 1794 to 25 March 1794.

This session was also traditionally cited as 34 G. 3.

There were no private acts passed in this session.

=== Public acts ===
Short title, or popular name	Citation	Royal assent
Long title
Hearth Duty Act 1794 (repealed)	34 Geo. 3. c. 1 (I)	25 March 1794
An Act giving to his majesty for one year the duties therein mentioned on fire hearths, in lieu of all duties payable on the same, prior to or during the said term. (Repealed by Statute Law Revision (Ireland) Act 1879 (42 & 43 Vict. c. 24))
Postage Act 1794 (repealed)	34 Geo. 3. c. 2 (I)	25 March 1794
An Act for granting to his majesty, his heirs and successors, certain rates and duties upon the portage and conveyance of all letters and packets within this kingdom. (Repealed by Statute Law Revision (Ireland) Act 1879 (42 & 43 Vict. c. 24))
Stamps Act (Ireland) 1794 (repealed)	34 Geo. 3. c. 3 (I)	25 March 1794
An Act for granting to his majesty, his heirs and successors, several duties therein mentioned, to be levied by the commissioners for managing the stamp duties. (Repealed by Statute Law Revision (Ireland) Act 1879 (42 & 43 Vict. c. 24))
Loan and Consolidated Fund Act 1794 (repealed)	34 Geo. 3. c. 4 (I)	25 March 1794
An Act for securing the payment of annuities and of the interest of the principal sums therein provided for, and towards the discharge of such principal sums in such manner as therein is directed, and for enabling the officers of his majesty's treasury to receive certain sums for a limited time in manner therein mentioned, and for granting to his majesty a certain sum of money out of the consolidated fund, and for applying a certain sum of money therein mentioned for the service of the year 1794, and for other purposes. (Repealed by Statute Law Revision (Ireland) Act 1879 (42 & 43 Vict. c. 24))
Duties and Trade Regulation Act 1794 (repealed)	34 Geo. 3. c. 5 (I)	25 March 1794
An Act for granting for one year the several duties therein mentioned, in lieu of all other duties payable upon the articles therein specified, during the said term, and for continuing the effect of the treaty of commerce and navigation signed at Versailles on the 26th day of September 1786, between his majesty and the most Christian king, (Note: 'Most Christian King' is a reference to the King of France.) and for regulating the trade between this kingdom and his majesty's colonies, and for other purposes therein mentioned. (Repealed by Statute Law Revision (Ireland) Act 1879 (42 & 43 Vict. c. 24))
Building of Law Courts Act 1794 (repealed)	34 Geo. 3. c. 6 (I)	25 March 1794
An Act for enabling the lord high chancellor of Ireland and the court of exchequer respectively, to make orders on the governor and company of the Bank of Ireland, for payment out of the general fund of monies belonging to the suitors of the courts of chancery and exchequer, of the further sum therein mentioned, towards building the principal courts of justice at Dublin, and law offices, for declaring that all government securities purchased by the governor and directors of the said bank, and profits arising there from, should be placed to the account of the governor and company of the said bank. (Repealed by Statute Law Revision (Ireland) Act 1879 (42 & 43 Vict. c. 24))
County Treasurers Act 1794 (repealed)	34 Geo. 3. c. 7 (I)	25 March 1794
An Act to prevent the Inconveniencies which may arise, during the Vacancy of the Office of Treasurer of a County. (Repealed by Statute Law Revision (Ireland) Act 1879 (42 & 43 Vict. c. 24))
River Anna Liffey Fire Prevention Act 1794	34 Geo. 3. c. 8 (I)	25 March 1794
An Act for preventing the graving and careening ships, gabbards or boats, and to prevent fires being kept on board any ship, gabbard or boat, between the bridge commonly called Bloody Bridge, (Note: Barrack Bridge, Dublin.) and the river called Dodder, alias Donnybrook, in the River Anna Liffey, in the city of Dublin.
Water Supply Act 1794	34 Geo. 3. c. 9 (I)	25 March 1794
An Act to explain and amend an Act passed in the Twenty-ninth Year of His present Majesty, entitled, "An Act for the better supplying the Inhabitants of certain Cities and Towns with Water." (Note: Water Supply Act 1789 (29 Geo. 3. c. 42 (I)))
Revenue Act 1794 (repealed)	34 Geo. 3. c. 10 (I)	25 March 1794
An Act for continuing and amending the several laws relating to his majesty's revenue, and for the more effectually preventing frauds therein, and for regulating and extending the tobacco trade of this kingdom. (Repealed by Statute Law Revision (Ireland) Act 1879 (42 & 43 Vict. c. 24))
Spirit Licences Act 1794 (repealed)	34 Geo. 3. c. 11 (I)	25 March 1794
An Act for continuing the several laws relating to the licences for the sale of spirituous liquors, and the regulations for remedying the abuses which have arisen from the immoderate use of such liquors. (Repealed by Statute Law Revision (Ireland) Act 1879 (42 & 43 Vict. c. 24))
Relief of Insolvent Debtors Act 1794	34 Geo. 3. c. 12 (I)	25 March 1794
An Act to explain, amend and render more effectual an act passed in the 33rd year of the reign of his present majesty, entitled, "An Act for the relief of insolvent debtors in regard the imprisonment of their persons." (Note: Relief of Insolvent Debtors Act 1793 (33 Geo. 3. c. 42 (I)))
Militia Act (Ireland) 1794 (repealed)	34 Geo. 3. c. 13 (I)	25 March 1794
An Act for defraying the charge of the pay and clothing of the militia for one year from the 25th March 1794, and for the more easily raising the same. (Repealed by Statute Law Revision (Ireland) Act 1879 (42 & 43 Vict. c. 24))
Aiding the French Act 1794 (repealed)	34 Geo. 3. c. 14 (I)	25 March 1794
An Act for preventing money or effects in the hands of his majesty's subjects, belonging to or disposable by persons resident in France, being applied to the use of the persons exercising the powers of government in France, and for preserving the property thereof, for the benefit of the individual owners thereof. (Repealed by Statute Law Revision (Ireland) Act 1879 (42 & 43 Vict. c. 24))
Dublin Society Act 1794	34 Geo. 3. c. 15 (I)	25 March 1794
An Act for directing the application of the sum of £5,500, granted by parliament to the Dublin Society, (Note: Royal Dublin Society.) for the improvement of husbandry and other useful arts, and to the Royal Irish Academy, (Note: Royal Irish Academy.) and for enabling the Incorporated Society (Note: The Incorporated Society for Promoting English Protestant Schools in Ireland.) to elect to their officers and members of the committee of 15 on the first Wednesday in February in every year.
Expiring Laws Continuance (No. 2) Act 1794 (repealed)	34 Geo. 3. c. 16 (I)	25 March 1794
An Act for continuing an act passed last session of parliament, entitled, "An Act for establishing regulations respecting aliens arriving in this kingdom or resident therein, in certain cases, and subjects of this kingdom who have served or are serving in foreign armies," (Note: Alien Act 1793 (33 Geo. 3. c. 1 (I))) and for continuing and amending another act passed in the same session of parliament, entitled, "An Act to prevent the importation of arms, gunpowder and ammunition into this kingdom, and the removing and keeping of gunpowder, arms and ammunition without licence." (Note: Arms Act 1793 (33 Geo. 3. c. 2 (I))) (Repealed by Statute Law Revision (Ireland) Act 1879 (42 & 43 Vict. c. 24))
Linen and Hempen Manufactures Act 1794	34 Geo. 3. c. 17 (I)	25 March 1794
An Act for a more effectual redress in cases of fraudulent or damaged linens, and for enforcing county inspectors to an effectual execution of their duty, and otherwise promoting the linen and hempen manufactures.
Court of Conscience (Dublin) Act 1794 (repealed)	34 Geo. 3. c. 18 (I)	25 March 1794
An Act for reducing the Time of the Imprisonment of Debtors, committed to Prison for small Debts, upon Suits in the Court of Conscience, of the City of Dublin. (Repealed for the Republic of Ireland by Statute Law Revision (Pre-Union Irish Statutes) Act 1962 (No. 29))
Mutiny Act (Ireland) 1794 (repealed)	34 Geo. 3. c. 19 (I)	25 March 1794
An Act for punishing Mutiny and Desertion, and for the better Payment of the Army and their Quarters within this Kingdom. (Repealed by Statute Law Revision (Ireland) Act 1879 (42 & 43 Vict. c. 24))
Irish Musical Fund Act 1794^{(Republic of Ireland)}	34 Geo. 3. c. 20 (I)	25 March 1794
An Act for securing a Capital Stock, belonging to the Members of the Irish Musical-Fund, applicable to charitable Purposes.
Duties on Hides Act 1794 (repealed)	34 Geo. 3. c. 21 (I)	25 March 1794
An Act for granting to his majesty the duties therein mentioned on hides and skins and manufactures of leather. (Repealed by Statute Law Revision (Ireland) Act 1879 (42 & 43 Vict. c. 24))
Roman Catholic Relief (Fees) Act 1794 (repealed)	34 Geo. 3. c. 22 (I)	25 March 1794
An Act for ascertaining the Fees payable by such Roman Catholics as qualify. (Repealed by Statute Law Revision (Ireland) Act 1879 (42 & 43 Vict. c. 24))
Expiring Laws Continuance (No. 3) Act 1794 (repealed)	34 Geo. 3. c. 23 (I)	25 March 1794
An Act for reviving and continuing certain temporary Statutes. (Repealed by Statute Law Revision (Ireland) Act 1879 (42 & 43 Vict. c. 24))
Trade with United States Act 1794 (repealed)	34 Geo. 3. c. 24 (I)	25 March 1794
An Act for further continuing an act, entitled, "An Act for facilitating the trade and intercourse between this kingdom and the United States of America." (Note: Trade with United States Act 1788 (28 Geo. 3. c. 18 (I))) (Repealed by Statute Law Revision (Ireland) Act 1879 (42 & 43 Vict. c. 24))
Export Bounties Act 1794 (repealed)	34 Geo. 3. c. 25 (I)	25 March 1794
An Act for regulating the Payment of Bounties on the Exportation of certain Manufactures of this Kingdom. (Repealed by Statute Law Revision (Ireland) Act 1879 (42 & 43 Vict. c. 24))
Town of Wexford (Improvement) Act 1794^{(Republic of Ireland)} or the Town of Wexford Act 1794	34 Geo. 3. c. 26 (I)	25 March 1794
An Act for the Improvement of the Town and Harbour of Wexford, and for building a Bridge or Bridges over the River Slaney, at or near said Town.

=== Sources ===
- "Acts of Parliament by Session: 1794". Irish Legislation Database. Queen's University Belfast.
- "Pre-Union Irish Statutes: 1794 Acts". Irish Statute Book. Attorney General of Ireland.

== 35 Geo. 3 (1795) ==
The 6th session of the 5th parliament of George III, which met from 22 January 1795 to 5 June 1795.

This session was also traditionally cited as 35 G. 3.

=== Public acts ===
Short title, or popular name	Citation	Royal assent
Long title
Hearth Duty Act 1795 (repealed)	35 Geo. 3. c. 1 (I)	24 March 1795
An Act for giving to his majesty for one year the duties therein mentioned on fire hearths, in lieu of all duties payable on the same, prior to or during the said term. (Repealed by Statute Law Revision (Ireland) Act 1879 (42 & 43 Vict. c. 24))
Families of Militiamen Act 1795	35 Geo. 3. c. 2 (I)	24 March 1795
An Act for the more effectual Support of the Families of Militia-Men.
Hides and Leather Duties Act 1795 (repealed)	35 Geo. 3. c. 3 (I)	24 March 1795
An Act for granting to his majesty the duties therein mentioned, on hides and skins, and manufactures of leather. (Repealed by Statute Law Revision (Ireland) Act 1879 (42 & 43 Vict. c. 24))
Duties and Trade Regulation Act 1795 (repealed)	35 Geo. 3. c. 4 (I)	24 March 1795
An Act for granting for one year the several duties therein mentioned, in lieu of all other duties payable upon the articles therein specified, during the said term, and for continuing the effect of the treaty of commerce and navigation signed at Versailles on the 26th day of September 1786, between his majesty and the most Christian king, (Note: 'Most Christian King' is a reference to the King of France.) and for regulating the trade between this kingdom and his majesty's colonies, and for other purposes therein mentioned. (Repealed by Statute Law Revision (Ireland) Act 1879 (42 & 43 Vict. c. 24))
Militia Act (Ireland) 1795 (repealed)	35 Geo. 3. c. 5 (I)	24 March 1795
An Act for defraying the charge of the pay and clothing of the militia for one year, from the 25th day of March 1795, and for the more easily raising the same. (Repealed by Statute Law Revision (Ireland) Act 1879 (42 & 43 Vict. c. 24))
National Debt Act (Ireland) 1795 (repealed)	35 Geo. 3. c. 6 (I)	24 March 1795
An Act for securing the payment of the annuities and of the interest upon the principal sums therein provided for, and towards the discharge of such principal sums in such manner as therein is directed, and for enabling the officers of his majesty's treasury to receive certain sums for a limited time in manner therein mentioned, and for granting to his majesty a certain sum of money out of the consolidated fund, and for applying a certain sum of money therein mentioned for their service of the year 1795. (Repealed by Statute Law Revision (Ireland) Act 1879 (42 & 43 Vict. c. 24))
Grand Jury Presentments Act 1795 (repealed)	35 Geo. 3. c. 7 (I)	24 March 1795
An Act for the Regulation of Presentments, for the Purpose of levying Money to be expended in erecting Court-houses, Gaols, and other expensive Buildings. (Repealed by Statute Law Revision (Ireland) Act 1879 (42 & 43 Vict. c. 24))
Militia (No. 2) Act (Ireland) 1795 (repealed)	35 Geo. 3. c. 8 (I)	24 March 1795
An Act to explain and amend an Act, passed in the Thirty-third Year of the Reign of His present Majesty, entitled, "An Act for amending and reducing into one Act of Parliament, the Laws relating to the Militia of Ireland." (Note: Militia Act (Ireland) 1793 (33 Geo. 3. c. 22 (I))) (Repealed by Militia (Ireland) Act 1809 (49 Geo. 3. c. 120))
Stamp Act 1795 (repealed)	35 Geo. 3. c. 9 (I)	24 March 1795
An Act for granting to his majesty, his heirs and successors, several duties therein mentioned, to be levied by the commissioners for managing the stamp duties. (Repealed by Statute Law Revision (Ireland) Act 1879 (42 & 43 Vict. c. 24))
Trade with the United States Act 1795 (repealed)	35 Geo. 3. c. 10 (I)	24 March 1795
An Act for continuing an act, entitled, "An Act for facilitating the trade and intercourse between this kingdom and the United States of America." (Note: Trade with United States Act 1788 (28 Geo. 3. c. 18 (I))) (Repealed by Statute Law Revision (Ireland) Act 1879 (42 & 43 Vict. c. 24))
Postage Act 1795 (repealed)	35 Geo. 3. c. 11 (I)	24 March 1795
An Act for granting to his majesty, his heirs and successors, certain rates and duties upon the portage and conveyance of all letters and packets within this kingdom. (Repealed by Statute Law Revision (Ireland) Act 1879 (42 & 43 Vict. c. 24))
Pre-Union Irish Statutes (Commencement) Act 1795^{(Republic of Ireland)} or the Acts of Parliament (Commencement) Act (Ireland) 1795^{(United Kingdom)}	35 Geo. 3. c. 12 (I)	24 March 1795
An Act that Acts of Parliament shall commence from the Time of the Royal Assent given.
Indemnity Act (Ireland) 1795 (repealed)	35 Geo. 3. c. 13 (I)	24 March 1795
An Act for indemnifying such persons as have acted for the service of the public, in advising or carrying into execution two proclamations of the lord lieutenant and council of this kingdom, bearing date the 24th and 29th days of January 1795, respectively, and for continuing and giving effect to the said proclamations. (Repealed by Statute Law Revision (Ireland) Act 1879 (42 & 43 Vict. c. 24))
Mutiny Act (Ireland) 1795 (repealed)	35 Geo. 3. c. 14 (I)	24 March 1795
An Act for punishing mutiny and desertion, and for the better payment of the army and their quarters within this kingdom. (Repealed by Statute Law Revision (Ireland) Act 1879 (42 & 43 Vict. c. 24))
Export Bounties Act 1795 (repealed)	35 Geo. 3. c. 15 (I)	24 March 1795
An Act for regulating the payment of bounties on the exportation of certain manufactures of this kingdom. (Repealed by Statute Law Revision (Ireland) Act 1879 (42 & 43 Vict. c. 24))
Toomevara to Limerick Road Act 1795	35 Geo. 3. c. 16 (I)	24 March 1795
An Act to repeal an Act of the Eleventh of George the Second, entitled, "An Act for repairing the High Road, from the Town of Toomivaragh, (Note: Toomevara, County Tipperary.) in the County of Tipperary, to the Towns of Silvermines (Note: Silvermines, County Tipperary.) and Nenagh, (Note: Nenagh, County Tipperary.) and from said Towns by Shally Orchard, (Note: Shallee Orchard, County Tipperary.) through the Town of Tullo (Note: Newport, County Tipperary.) in the said County, to the City of Limerick," (Note: Limerick, County Limerick.) (Note: Toomevara to Limerick Road Act 1737 (11 Geo. 2. c. 18 (I))) as also one other Act passed in the Seventeenth Year of George the Second, (Note: Toomevara to Limerick Road Act 1743 (17 Geo. 2. c. 13 (I))) to explain, continue, and amend the first recited Act.
Portumna Bridge Act 1795	35 Geo. 3. c. 17 (I)	24 March 1795
An Act for building a Bridge over the River Shannon at Portumna in the County of Galway.
Audit of Public Accounts Act 1795 (repealed)	35 Geo. 3. c. 18 (I)	5 June 1795
An Act for auditing and settling certain accounts now remaining unsettled at his majesty's treasury. (Repealed by Statute Law Revision (Ireland) Act 1879 (42 & 43 Vict. c. 24))
Brewers Act 1795 (repealed)	35 Geo. 3. c. 19 (I)	5 June 1795
An Act for repealing the several Regulations which affect the Trade of a Brewer in this Kingdom. (Repealed by Statute Law Revision (Ireland) Act 1879 (42 & 43 Vict. c. 24))
Spirit Licences Act 1795	35 Geo. 3. c. 20 (I)	5 June 1795
An Act for continuing an act, entitled, "An Act for continuing the several laws relating to licences for the sale of spirituous liquors, and the regulations for remedying the abuses which have arisen from the immoderate use of such liquors." (Note: Spirit Licences Act 1794 (34 Geo. 3. c. 11 (I)))
Maynooth College Act 1795^{(Republic of Ireland)}	35 Geo. 3. c. 21 (I)	5 June 1795
An Act for the better Education of Persons professing the Popish, or Roman Catholick Religion.
School of Physic Act 1795 (repealed)	35 Geo. 3. c. 22 (I)	5 June 1795
An Act to explain an Act, entitled, "An Act for establishing a complete School of Physick in this kingdom." (Note: School of Physic Act 1785 (25 Geo. 3. c. 42 (I))) (Repealed by Statute Law Revision (Ireland) Act 1879 (42 & 43 Vict. c. 24))
Ecclesiastical Lands Act 1795^{(Republic of Ireland)}	35 Geo. 3. c. 23 (I)	5 June 1795
An Act to explain and amend an Act passed in the Tenth and Eleventh Years of the Reign of King Charles the First, entitled, "An Act for Preservation of the Inheritance, Rights, and Profits of Lands belonging to the church and Persons Ecclesiastical." (Note: Ecclesiastical Lands Act 1634 (10 & 11 Chas. 1. c. 3 (I)))
Expiring Laws Continuance Act 1795 (repealed)	35 Geo. 3. c. 24 (I)	5 June 1795
An Act for continuing an Act, passed in the Thirty-third Year of His Majesty's Reign, entitled, "An Act for establishing Regulations respecting Aliens arriving in this Kingdom, or resident therein, in certain Cases, and Subjects of this Kingdom, who have served, or are serving in Foreign Armies," (Note: Alien Act 1793 (33 Geo. 3. c. 1 (I))) and for continuing and amending another Act passed in the same Year, entitled, "An Act to prevent the importation of Arms, Gunpowder, and Ammunition into this Kingdom, and the removing and keeping of Gunpowder, Arms, and Ammunition without License," (Note: Arms Act 1793 (33 Geo. 3. c. 2 (I))) and for amending the said last mentioned Act. (Repealed by Statute Law Revision (Ireland) Act 1879 (42 & 43 Vict. c. 24))
Courts of Justice (Dublin) Act 1795^{(Republic of Ireland)}	35 Geo. 3. c. 25 (I)	5 June 1795
An Act for establishing the New Courts of Justice, and New Session-House, and constituting the same, and the Areas thereof respectively, to be within the County of the City of Dublin, and County of Dublin.
Starch Exportation Act 1795 (repealed)	35 Geo. 3. c. 26 (I)	5 June 1795
An Act to prevent the Exportation of Starch, under certain Conditions. (Repealed by Statute Law Revision (Ireland) Act 1879 (42 & 43 Vict. c. 24))
Starch Exportation Act 1795 (repealed)	35 Geo. 3. c. 27 (I)	5 June 1795
An Act for the Preservation of the Publick Roads in this Kingdom, and for the Encouragement of Broad-wheeled Carriages. (Repealed by Statute Law Revision (Ireland) Act 1879 (42 & 43 Vict. c. 24))
Collection of Revenue Act 1795^{(Republic of Ireland)} (repealed)	35 Geo. 3. c. 28 (I)	5 June 1795
An Act for the better Regulation of the Receipts and Issues of His Majesty's Treasury and for repealing an Act of Parliament, passed in the Tenth Year of Henry the Seventh, entitled, "An Act authorizing the Treasurer to make all Officers as the Treasurer of England doth." (Note: Treasurer's Officers Act (Ireland) 1495 (10 Hen. 7. c. 1 (I))) (Repealed for the Republic of Ireland by Statute Law Revision (Pre-Union Irish Statutes) Act 1962 (No. 29) and for Northern Ireland by Statute Law (Repeals) Act 1978 (c. 45))
Parliamentary Elections Act 1795 (repealed)	35 Geo. 3. c. 29 (I)	5 June 1795
An Act for regulating the Election of Members to serve in Parliament, and for repealing the several Acts therein mentioned. (Repealed for Northern Ireland by Representation of the People Act 1948 (11 & 12 Geo. 6. c. 65) and for the Republic of Ireland by Statute Law Revision (Pre-Union Irish Statutes) Act 1962 (No. 29))
Insolvent Debtors Relief Act 1795 (repealed)	35 Geo. 3. c. 30 (I)	5 June 1795
An Act for the relief of insolvent Debtors, in regard to the imprisonment of their Persons. (Repealed by Statute Law Revision (Ireland) Act 1879 (42 & 43 Vict. c. 24))
Relief of Peter Adams Act 1795 (repealed)	35 Geo. 3. c. 31 (I)	5 June 1795
An Act to explain, amend and render more effectual an act passed in the 31st year of his present majesty's reign, entitled, "An Act for the relief of insolvent debtors with respect to the imprisonment of their persons." (Note: Relief of Insolvent Debtors Act 1791 (31 Geo. 3. c. 21 (I))) (Repealed by Statute Law Revision (Ireland) Act 1879 (42 & 43 Vict. c. 24))
Tithes Act 1795 (repealed)	35 Geo. 3. c. 32 (I)	5 June 1795
An Act to explain an Act passed in the Seventh Year of the Reign of His present Majesty, (Note: Tithes Act 1767 (7 Geo. 3. c. 21 (I))) entitled, "An Act to continue and amend an Act passed in the Third Year of His Majesty's reign, (Note: Tithes Act 1763 (3 Geo. 3. c. 25 (I))) entitled, 'An Act to amend and explain an Act made in the Thirty-third Year of the Reign of Henry the Eighth, (Note: Tithes Act 1542 (33 Hen. 8. c. 12 (I))) entitled "An Act for Tythes," and for other Purposes therein mentioned.'" (Repealed by Statute Law Revision (Ireland) Act 1879 (42 & 43 Vict. c. 24))
Fisheries Act 1795 (repealed)	35 Geo. 3. c. 33 (I)	5 June 1795
An Act to continue for one year several acts for the encouragement of the fisheries on the coasts of this kingdom. (Repealed by Statute Law Revision (Ireland) Act 1879 (42 & 43 Vict. c. 24))
Dublin Grand Jury Presentments Act 1795	35 Geo. 3. c. 34 (I)	5 June 1795
An Act to explain and render more effectual an act of Parliament, made and passed in the thirty-third year of the reign of his present Majesty, entitled, "An act respecting the collection of public money, to be levied off the county of the city of Dublin, by presentment." (Note: Dublin Grand Jury Presentments Act 1793 (33 Geo. 3. c. 56 (I)))
Lotteries Act 1795 (repealed)	35 Geo. 3. c. 35 (I)	5 June 1795
An Act for amending the Laws for the Regulation of Lottery Offices, and for preventing the Insurance of Lottery Tickets. (Repealed by Statute Law Revision (Ireland) Act 1879 (42 & 43 Vict. c. 24))
Dublin Police Act 1795	35 Geo. 3. c. 36 (I)	5 June 1795
An Act for more effectually preserving the Peace within the City of Dublin, and the District of the Metropolis, and establishing a Parochial Watch in the said City.
Exchequer Bills Act 1795 (repealed)	35 Geo. 3. c. 37 (I)	5 June 1795
An Act for raising the sum therein mentioned, to defray such extraordinary expenses as may be necessarily incurred for the service of the present year. (Repealed by Statute Law Revision (Ireland) Act 1879 (42 & 43 Vict. c. 24))
Post Roads Act 1795 (repealed)	35 Geo. 3. c. 38 (I)	5 June 1795
An Act for further Improving the Post Roads in this Kingdom. (Repealed by Statute Law Revision (Ireland) Act 1879 (42 & 43 Vict. c. 24))
English Patents Confirmation Act 1795 (repealed)	35 Geo. 3. c. 39 (I)	5 June 1795
An Act for confirming Grants heretofore made by Patents under the Great Seal of England. (Repealed by Statute Law Revision (Ireland) Act 1879 (42 & 43 Vict. c. 24))
Indemnity Act (Ireland) (No. 2) 1795 (repealed)	35 Geo. 3. c. 40 (I)	5 June 1795
An Act for the relief of Persons who have omitted to qualify themselves according to Law. (Repealed by Statute Law Revision (Ireland) Act 1879 (42 & 43 Vict. c. 24))
Revenue Act 1795 (repealed)	35 Geo. 3. c. 41 (I)	5 June 1795
An Act for continuing and amending the several laws relating to his majesty's revenue, and further preventing frauds therein. (Repealed by Statute Law Revision (Ireland) Act 1879 (42 & 43 Vict. c. 24))
Assize of Bread Act 1795 (repealed)	35 Geo. 3. c. 42 (I)	5 June 1795
An Act for regulating the Baking Trade. (Repealed by Statute Law Revision (Ireland) Act 1879 (42 & 43 Vict. c. 24))
Dublin and Mullingar Road Act 1795	35 Geo. 3. c. 43 (I)	5 June 1795
An Act for improving and repairing the Turnpike Road leading from Dublin to Mullingar, and for repealing the several Laws heretofore made relating to the said Road.
Grand Canal Act 1795	35 Geo. 3. c. 44 (I)	5 June 1795
An Act for Payment to the Company of Undertakers of the Grand Canal, of certain Bounties heretofore granted to them.
Speaker of the House of Commons Act 1795 (repealed)	35 Geo. 3. c. 45 (I)	5 June 1795
An Act that the Acceptance of the Office of a Lord Justice, or Chief Governor of this Kingdom by the Speaker of the House of Commons, shall not vacate his Seat in Parliament. (Repealed by Statute Law Revision (Ireland) Act 1879 (42 & 43 Vict. c. 24))
Supply of Copies of Statutes Act 1795 (repealed)	35 Geo. 3. c. 46 (I)	5 June 1795
An Act for the better promulgating the Statute Law of this Kingdom. (Repealed by Statute Law Revision (Ireland) Act 1879 (42 & 43 Vict. c. 24))
Dublin and Ratoath Road Act 1795	35 Geo. 3. c. 47 (I)	5 June 1795
An Act for making, widening and repairing the road leading from the city of Dublin to Ratoath, and for erecting turnpikes thereon in aid of barony presentments.
New Ross Bridge Act 1795^{(Republic of Ireland)} or the Town of New Ross Act 1795	35 Geo. 3. c. 48 (I)	5 June 1795
An Act for creating a Bridge over the River of Ross, at the Town of New Ross, in the County of Wexford.

=== Private acts ===
Short title, or popular name	Citation	Royal assent
Long title
Earl of Ormonde's Estate Act 1795	35 Geo. 3. c. 1 Pr. (I)	5 June 1795
An Act for the Sale of competent Parts of the Real Estates of the Right Honourable John Earl of Ormonde, and the Honourable Walter Butler, commonly called Lord Viscount Thurles, his eldest Son and Heir Apparent, for the Payment of Debts, Charges, and Incumbrances affecting the same; and for settling such Part and Parts thereof as shall not be sold for the Purposes aforesaid, and for other Purposes.
Earl of Clanwilliam's Estate Act 1795	35 Geo. 3. c. 2 Pr. (I)	5 June 1795
An Act for the sale of certain towns, lands, tenements and hereditaments in the county of Tipperary, the estates of the Right Honourable John, earl of Clanwilliam, and the Right Honourable Richard Meade, commonly called Lord Viscount Gilford, the eldest son and heir apparent of the said John, earl of Clanwilliam, for the purposes therein mentioned, and for settling other estates in the county of Down in lieu thereof, and for other purposes.

=== Sources ===
- "Acts of Parliament by Session: 1795". Irish Legislation Database. Queen's University Belfast.
- "Pre-Union Irish Statutes: 1795 Acts". Irish Statute Book. Attorney General of Ireland.

== 36 Geo. 3 (1796) ==
The 7th session of the 5th parliament of George III, which met from 21 January 1796 to 15 April 1796.

This session was also traditionally cited as 36 G. 3.

=== Public acts ===
Short title, or popular name	Citation	Royal assent
Long title
National Debt Act (Ireland) 1796 (repealed)	36 Geo. 3. c. 1 (I)	24 March 1796
An Act for securing the Payment of the Annuities, and of the Interest upon the Principal Sums therein provided for, and towards the Discharge of such Principal Sums in such Manner as therein is directed, and for enabling the Officers of His Majesty's Treasury to receive certain Sums for a limited Time, in Manner therein mentioned, and for granting to His Majesty certain Sums of Money out of the Consolidated Fund, and for applying a certain sum of Money therein mentioned, for the Service of the Year One thousand seven hundred and ninety-six, and for other Purposes. (Repealed for the Republic of Ireland by Statute Law Revision (Pre-Union Irish Statutes) Act 1962 (No. 29) and for Northern Ireland by the Statute Law Revision Act 1950 (14 Geo. 6. c. 6))
Duties and Bounties Act 1796 (repealed)	36 Geo. 3. c. 2 (I)	24 March 1796
An Act for granting for one year, the several duties therein mentioned in lieu of all other duties payable upon the articles therein specified, during the said term, and for regulating the trade between this kingdom and his majesty's colonies, and for other purposes therein mentioned. (Repealed by Statute Law Revision (Ireland) Act 1879 (42 & 43 Vict. c. 24))
Export Bounties Act 1796 (repealed)	36 Geo. 3. c. 3 (I)	24 March 1796
An Act for regulating the payment of bounties on the exportation of certain manufactures of this kingdom. (Repealed by Statute Law Revision (Ireland) Act 1879 (42 & 43 Vict. c. 24))
Road from Tomahoe to Tipperary Act 1796	36 Geo. 3. c. 4 (I)	24 March 1796
An Act to amend an act passed in the 15th and 16th years of his present majesty's reign, (Note: Road from Tomahoe to Tipperary Act 1776 (15 & 16 Geo. 3. c. 36 (I))) for continuing, amending and making more effectual an act passed in the 13th year of the reign of his present majesty King George II, (Note: Road from Timahoe to Tipperary Act 1739 (13 Geo. 2. c. 14 (I))) for repairing the road from Timaho (Note: Timahoe, County Laois.) in the Queen's County, through Ballynakill, (Note: Ballinakill, County Laois.) Durrow, (Note: Durrow, County Laois.) Beggars' Inn, and from thence through the city of Cashel (Note: Cashel, County Tipperary.) to the town of Tipperary in the county of Tipperary.
Trade with the United States Act 1796 (repealed)	36 Geo. 3. c. 5 (I)	24 March 1796
An Act for continuing an act, entitled, "An Act for facilitating the trade and intercourse between this kingdom and the United States of America." (Note: Trade with United States Act 1788 (28 Geo. 3. c. 18 (I))) (Repealed by Statute Law Revision (Ireland) Act 1879 (42 & 43 Vict. c. 24))
Indemnity Act (Ireland) 1796 (repealed)	36 Geo. 3. c. 6 (I)	24 March 1796
An Act for indemnifying such persons as have acted since the 1st day of January 1795 for the preservation of the public peace, and suppression of insurrections prevailing in some parts of this kingdom. (Repealed by Statute Law Revision (Ireland) Act 1879 (42 & 43 Vict. c. 24))
Post Office Act 1796 (repealed)	36 Geo. 3. c. 7 (I)	24 March 1796
An Act to further explain and amend an Act, passed in the Twenty-third and Twenty-fourth Years of His present Majesty's Reign, entitled, "An Act for establishing a Post Office within this Kingdom," (Note: Post Office Act 1783 (23 & 24 Geo. 3. c. 17 (I))) and to explain and amend an Act passed in the Twenty eighth Year of His present Majesty's Reign, (Note: Post Office Act 1788 (28 Geo. 3. c. 13 (I))) entitled, "An Act to explain and amend an Act, passed in the Twenty-third and Twenty-fourth Years of His present Majesty's Reign, entitled, 'An Act for establishing a Post Office within this Kingdom.'" (Repealed by Post Office (Repeal of Laws) Act 1837 (7 Will. 4 & 1 Vict. c. 32))
	36 Geo. 3. c. 8 (I)	24 March 1796
An Act to enable the lord lieutenant and council to prohibit the export of corn, grain, meal, malt, flour, bread, biscuit, peas, beans, potatoes, starch and hair powder for a limited time. (Repealed by Statute Law Revision (Ireland) Act 1879 (42 & 43 Vict. c. 24))
County Infirmaries Act 1796 (repealed)	36 Geo. 3. c. 9 (I)	24 March 1796
An Act for the further Regulation of Public Infirmaries or Hospitals. (Repealed by Statute Law Revision (Ireland) Act 1879 (42 & 43 Vict. c. 24))
Duties on Hides Act 1796 (repealed)	36 Geo. 3. c. 10 (I)	24 March 1796
An Act for granting to his majesty the duties therein mentioned on hides and skins and manufactures of leather. (Repealed by Statute Law Revision (Ireland) Act 1879 (42 & 43 Vict. c. 24))
Postage Act (Ireland) 1796 (repealed)	36 Geo. 3. c. 11 (I)	24 March 1796
An Act for granting to his majesty, his heirs and successors, certain rates and duties upon the portage and conveyance of all letters and packets within this kingdom. (Repealed by Statute Law Revision (Ireland) Act 1879 (42 & 43 Vict. c. 24))
County Treasurers Act 1796	36 Geo. 3. c. 12 (I)	24 March 1796
An Act to amend an act passed in the 13th and 14th years of George III, entitled, "An Act for the better regulation of county treasurers, and the duty of clerks of the crown respecting presentments, and to enable the grand jury of the county of Wicklow, to raise money by presentment for purchasing of ground or houses adjoining to the courthouse of the said county, for the purpose of building additions to the said courthouse." (Note: County Treasurers Act 1773 (13 & 14 Geo. 3. c. 18 (I)))
Road in Waterford Act 1796	36 Geo. 3. c. 13 (I)	24 March 1796
An Act for repairing the road, commonly called or known by the name of the Military Road, beginning at the county and city courthouses in the city of Waterford, and leading from thence to the town of Tallagh in the county of Waterford, through the towns of Kilmacthomas, Cappoquinn and Lismore, and from Tallagh aforesaid to the bounds of the county of Cork.
Mutiny Act (Ireland) 1796 (repealed)	36 Geo. 3. c. 14 (I)	24 March 1796
An Act for punishing mutiny and desertion, and for the better payment of the army and their quarters within this kingdom. (Repealed by Statute Law Revision (Ireland) Act 1879 (42 & 43 Vict. c. 24))
Hearth Duty Act 1796 (repealed)	36 Geo. 3. c. 15 (I)	24 March 1796
An Act for granting to his majesty for one year, the duties therein mentioned on fire hearths, in lieu of all duties payable on the same, during the said term. (Repealed by Statute Law Revision (Ireland) Act 1879 (42 & 43 Vict. c. 24))
Grants for Agriculture, &c. Act 1796 (repealed)	36 Geo. 3. c. 16 (I)	15 April 1796
An Act for directing the application of the sum of £5,500 granted by parliament to the Dublin Society, for the improving of husbandry and other useful arts. (Repealed by Statute Law Revision (Ireland) Act 1879 (42 & 43 Vict. c. 24))
Stamp Act 1796 (repealed)	36 Geo. 3. c. 17 (I)	24 March 1796
An Act for granting to his majesty, his heirs and successors, several duties therein mentioned to be levied by the commissioners for managing the stamp duties. (Repealed by Statute Law Revision (Ireland) Act 1879 (42 & 43 Vict. c. 24))
Lighthouses Act 1796 (repealed)	36 Geo. 3. c. 18 (I)	15 April 1796
An Act to empower the commissioners of his majesty's revenue, with the approbation of the lord lieutenant, to erect lighthouses around the coasts of this kingdom, and to levy a tonnage duty on all shipping. (Repealed by Statute Law Revision (Ireland) Act 1879 (42 & 43 Vict. c. 24))
Tallow Exportation Act 1796 (repealed)	36 Geo. 3. c. 19 (I)	15 April 1796
An Act to prevent the exportation of candles, tallow and soap for a limited time except to his majesty's dominions. (Repealed by Statute Law Revision (Ireland) Act 1879 (42 & 43 Vict. c. 24))
Insurrection Act 1796	36 Geo. 3. c. 20 (I)	24 March 1796
An Act more effectually to suppress Insurrections, and prevent the Disturbance of the publick Peace.
Sugar Act 1796 (repealed)	36 Geo. 3. c. 21 (I)	15 April 1796
An Act for the reduction of drawbacks on bounties, now allowed on the exportation of sugar. (Repealed by Statute Law Revision (Ireland) Act 1879 (42 & 43 Vict. c. 24))
Sites for Barracks Act 1796 (repealed)	36 Geo. 3. c. 22 (I)	15 April 1796
An Act for rendering more effectual the several laws heretofore made for the government and regulation of the barracks, and other public works in this kingdom. (Repealed by Statute Law Revision (Ireland) Act 1879 (42 & 43 Vict. c. 24))
Municipal Elections Act 1796 (repealed)	36 Geo. 3. c. 23 (I)	15 April 1796
An Act to amend certain Rules, Orders, and Directions, made by the Lord Lieutenant and Council of Ireland, for the better regulating of all Cities, Walled Towns, and Corporations within this Kingdom of Ireland; and the electing of Magistrates therein, so far as to change the Day of Election of Magistrates, from Christmas-day to another more proper day. (Repealed by Statute Law Revision (Ireland) Act 1879 (42 & 43 Vict. c. 24))
Militia Act (Ireland) 1796 (repealed)	36 Geo. 3. c. 24 (I)	15 April 1796
An Act for defraying the charge of the pay and clothing of the militia for one year, from the 25th day of March, 1796. (Repealed by Statute Law Revision (Ireland) Act 1879 (42 & 43 Vict. c. 24))
Civil Bill Courts Act 1796 (repealed)	36 Geo. 3. c. 25 (I)	15 April 1796
An Act for the better and more convenient Administration of Justice, and for the Recovery of Small Debts in a summary Way, at the Session of the Peace of the several Counties at large within this Kingdom, except the County of Dublin; and for continuing and amending an Act, intituled "An Act for the better Execution of the Law and Preservation of the Peace within Counties at large." (Note: Peace Preservation Act 1787 (27 Geo. 3. c. 40 (I))) (Repealed by Civil Bill Courts (Ireland) Act 1851 (14 & 15 Vict. c. 57))
Judges Salaries Act (Ireland) 1796 (repealed)	36 Geo. 3. c. 26 (I)	15 April 1796
An Act for encreasing the salaries of the Chief Justices, and other Judges of his Majesty's Courts of King's Bench, and Common Pleas, and of the Chief Barons, and other Barons of the Courts of Exchequer in this Kingdom. (Repealed for the Republic of Ireland by Statute Law Revision (Pre-Union Irish Statutes) Act 1962 (No. 29) and for Northern Ireland by Judicature (Northern Ireland) Act 1978 (c. 23))
Conspiracy to Murder Act 1796	36 Geo. 3. c. 27 (I)	15 April 1796
An Act to make conspiring to murder, Felony, without Benefit of Clergy.
	36 Geo. 3. c. 28 (I)	15 April 1796
An Act to empower millers, maltsters, brewers and distillers bringing corn and malt to the city of Dublin for the purposes of their manufacture to claim and receive bounty thereon, in the same manner and under the regulations as merchants and dealers may now receive the same. (Repealed by Statute Law Revision (Ireland) Act 1879 (42 & 43 Vict. c. 24))
	36 Geo. 3. c. 29 (I)	15 April 1796
An Act to render Persons convicted of Petty Larceny, competent Witnesses. (Repealed by Criminal Statutes (Ireland) Repeal Act 1828 (9 Geo. 4. c. 53))
Dublin Police Act 1796	36 Geo. 3. c. 30 (I)	15 April 1796
An Act to explain and amend an act passed in the 35th year of the reign of his present majesty, entitled, "An Act for more effectually preserving the peace within the city of Dublin and the district of the metropolis, and establishing a parochial watch in the said city," (Note: Dublin Police Act 1795 (35 Geo. 3. c. 36 (I))) and for remedying the abuses committed by pawnbrokers within the district of the metropolis or three miles thereof.
Treason by Women Act (Ireland) 1796^{(United Kingdom)}	36 Geo. 3. c. 31 (I)	15 April 1796
An Act for discontinuing the Judgment which has been required by Law to be given against Women convicted of certain crimes, and substituting another judgment in lieu thereof. (Repealed for the Republic of Ireland by Statute Law Revision (Pre-Union Irish Statutes) Act 1962 (No. 29))
Whiteboy (Dublin) Act 1796	36 Geo. 3. c. 32 (I)	15 April 1796
An Act to amend an Act, passed in Fifteenth and Sixteenth Years of His Majesty's Reign, entitled, "An Act to prevent and punish tumultuous Risings of Persons within the Kingdom," (Note: Tumultuous Risings Act 1775 (15 & 16 Geo. 3. c. 21 (I))) and for other Purposes therein mentioned. (Repealed for the Republic of Ireland by Statute Law Revision (Pre-Union Irish Statutes) Act 1962 (No. 29))
Militia (No. 2) Act (Ireland) 1796 (repealed)	36 Geo. 3. c. 33 (I)	15 April 1796
An Act to further explain and amend an act passed in the 33rd year of his majesty's reign, entitled, "An Act for amending and reducing into one act of parliament the laws relating to the militia of Ireland," (Note: Militia Act (Ireland) 1793 (33 Geo. 3. c. 22 (I))) and also an act passed in the 35th year of his majesty's reign, (Note: Militia (No. 2) Act (Ireland) 1795 (35 Geo. 3. c. 8 (I))) entitled, "An Act to explain and amend an act passed in the 33rd year of his majesty's reign, entitled, 'An Act for amending and reducing into one act of parliament, the laws relating to the militia of Ireland.'" (Repealed by Militia (Ireland) Act 1809 (49 Geo. 3. c. 120))
Expiring Laws Continuance Act 1796 (repealed)	36 Geo. 3. c. 34 (I)	15 April 1796
An Act to make perpetual the Laws for preventing Frauds committed by Bankrupts; also an Act for providing a Maintenance for Parish Clerks; and for continuing certain other Temporary Statutes. (Repealed by Statute Law Revision (Ireland) Act 1879 (42 & 43 Vict. c. 24))
Revenue Act 1796	36 Geo. 3. c. 35 (I)	15 April 1796
An Act for continuing and amending the several laws relating to his majesty's revenue, and further preventing frauds therein.
Repair of Roads Act 1796 (repealed)	36 Geo. 3. c. 36 (I)	15 April 1796
An Act for the more effectually keeping the Publick Roads in Repair by Contract. (Repealed by Statute Law Revision (Ireland) Act 1879 (42 & 43 Vict. c. 24))
Silk Manufacture Act 1796 (repealed)	36 Geo. 3. c. 37 (I)	15 April 1796
An Act to explain and amend an act passed in the 19th and 20th years of his present majesty's reign, entitled, "An Act for the better regulation of the silk manufacture." (Note: Silk Manufacture Act 1779 (19 & 20 Geo. 3. c. 24 (I))) (Repealed by Silk Manufactures Act 1824 (5 Geo. 4. c. 21))
Distress Act 1796^{(Republic of Ireland)}	36 Geo. 3. c. 38 (I)	15 April 1796
An Act to prevent Vexatious Replevins, of Distresses taken for Rent.
Inferior Courts Act 1796 (repealed)	36 Geo. 3. c. 39 (I)	15 April 1796
An Act to limit the Jurisdiction of Sheriffs in their County Courts, and of other inferior Courts. (Repealed by Statute Law Revision (Ireland) Act 1879 (42 & 43 Vict. c. 24))
Spirit Licences Act 1796 (repealed)	36 Geo. 3. c. 40 (I)	15 April 1796
An Act for regulating the issuing of licences for the sale of ale and spirituous liquors by retail, and for remedying the abuses which have arisen from the immoderate use of such liquors. (Repealed by Statute Law Revision (Ireland) Act 1879 (42 & 43 Vict. c. 24))
	36 Geo. 3. c. 41 (I)	15 April 1796
An Act to enable Guardians of Minors to demise or sell Grounds, the Property of such Minors, for the Purpose of having Court-Houses or Gaols built thereon. (Repealed by Statute Law Revision (Ireland) Act 1879 (42 & 43 Vict. c. 24))
Arms Act 1796 (repealed)	36 Geo. 3. c. 42 (I)	15 April 1796
An Act to prevent the Importation of Arms, Gun-Powder, and Ammunition into this Kingdom, and the making, removing, selling, and keeping of Gun-Powder, Arms, and Ammunition without License. (Repealed by Statute Law Revision (Ireland) Act 1879 (42 & 43 Vict. c. 24))
	36 Geo. 3. c. 43 (I)	15 April 1796
An Act to enable the lord lieutenant or other chief governor or governors for the time being, and council, when the price of corn or grain is above the rates of exportation, to prohibit the export of bread and biscuit, and to indemnify those who have prevented the export of the same. (Repealed by Statute Law Revision (Ireland) Act 1879 (42 & 43 Vict. c. 24))
Poddle River Act 1796^{(Republic of Ireland)}	36 Geo. 3. c. 44 (I)	15 April 1796
An Act for preventing the Inundations of the Poddle River in Dublin, and for preserving the Cathedral Church of Saint Patrick, and the Houses of the adjoining Inhabitants from the Damages arising therefrom.
	36 Geo. 3. c. 45 (I)	15 April 1796
An Act for the better Regulation of the Woollen and Cotton Manufactures. (Repealed by Criminal Statutes (Ireland) Repeal Act 1828 (9 Geo. 4. c. 53))
Indemnity (No. 2) Act (Ireland) 1796 (repealed)	36 Geo. 3. c. 46 (I)	15 April 1796
An Act for the relief of persons who have omitted to qualify themselves according to law. (Repealed by Statute Law Revision (Ireland) Act 1879 (42 & 43 Vict. c. 24))
	36 Geo. 3. c. 47 (I)	15 April 1796
An Act to amend certain Parts of the Laws, respecting the Linen and Hempen Manufactures.
Naturalization Act 1796 (repealed)	36 Geo. 3. c. 48 (I)	15 April 1796
An Act to explain and amend an act, entitled, "An Act for naturalizing such foreign merchants, traders, artificers, artisans, manufacturers, workmen, seamen, farmers and others as shall settle in this kingdom." (Note: Naturalization Act 1779 (19 & 20 Geo. 3. c. 29 (I))) (Repealed by Naturalization Act 1870 (33 & 34 Vict. c. 14))
Exchequer Bills Act (Ireland) 1796 (repealed)	36 Geo. 3. c. 49 (I)	15 April 1796
An Act for raising the Sum therein mentioned, to defray any extraordinary Expences which may be incurred for the Publick Service for the Year to end at Lady Day, One thousand seven hundred and ninety-seven. (Repealed by Statute Law Revision (Ireland) Act 1879 (42 & 43 Vict. c. 24))
Commons Act 1796 (repealed)	36 Geo. 3. c. 50 (I)	15 April 1796
An Act for rendering more effectual the laws for preventing encroachments, and the committing of waste on commons in this kingdom. (Repealed by Grand Jury (Ireland) Act 1836 (6 & 7 Will. 4. c. 116))
	36 Geo. 3. c. 51 (I)	15 April 1796
An Act to explain and amend several acts heretofore passed for the lighting, cleansing and watching of cities, towns corporate and market towns.
Sea Fisheries Act 1796 (repealed)	36 Geo. 3. c. 52 (I)	15 April 1796
An Act for continuing and amending the several Acts for the further Improvement and Extension of the Fisheries, on the Coasts of this Kingdom. (Repealed by Fisheries (Ireland) Act 1842 (5 & 6 Vict. c. 106))
Earl of Athlone's Annuity Act 1796 (repealed)	36 Geo. 3. c. 53 (I)	15 April 1796
An Act to enable his majesty to grant a certain annuity to Frederick Christian Rynhart de Ginkell, earl of Athlone, in consideration of his losses from the confiscation of his property on the continent, and of the high rank he holds in this kingdom, and of the services of his ancestor. (Repealed by Statute Law Revision (Ireland) Act 1879 (42 & 43 Vict. c. 24))
Dublin Wide Streets Act 1796	36 Geo. 3. c. 54 (I)	15 April 1796
An Act to ascertain the Powers of the Commissioners for making wide and convenient Streets in the City of Dublin, for opening the Passage from Sackville-street, to Carlisle-bridge, and for laying out new Streets to the Eastward thereof, and to ratify certain Grants heretofore made by the said Commissioners.
Highways Act 1796 (repealed)	36 Geo. 3. c. 55 (I)	15 April 1796
An Act for the amendment of the public roads, for directing the power of grand juries respecting presentments, and for repealing several laws heretofore made for those purposes. (Repealed by Statute Law Revision (Ireland) Act 1879 (42 & 43 Vict. c. 24))
Navy Pay and Pensions Act 1796 (repealed)	36 Geo. 3. c. 56 (I)	15 April 1796
An Act for the establishing an easy and expeditious method for the payment in this kingdom of half-pay to certain naval officers and of pensions to the widows of such officers, and bounties to the relations of naval officers, seamen and marines slain in fight with the enemy, and to enable petty officers in the navy, boatswains, gunners, carpenters and seamen, landsmen, non-commissioned officers of marines and marines serving in his majesty's navy to allot part of their wages or pay for the maintenance of their wives and families resident in this kingdom. (Repealed by Statute Law Revision (Ireland) Act 1879 (42 & 43 Vict. c. 24))
Canal Bridges Act 1796^{(Republic of Ireland)}	36 Geo. 3. c. 57 (I)	15 April 1796
An Act for the further improving and carrying on of Inland Navigations, not being in the Whole or in any Part private Property, and for regulating the Mode of building Bridges on Highways, where the same are intersected by any Canal.
Friendly Societies Act 1796 (repealed)	36 Geo. 3. c. 58 (I)	15 April 1796
An Act for the Encouragement and Relief of Friendly Societies. (Repealed by Friendly Societies Act 1829 (10 Geo. 4 c. 56))
Dublin and Navan Road Act 1796	36 Geo. 3. c. 59 (I)	15 April 1796
An Act for improving and repairing the Road leading from Dublin to Navan, and for repealing the several Laws here tofore made relating to the said Road.
Hutchinson's Charity Act 1796	36 Geo. 3. c. 60 (I)	24 March 1796
An Act to enable certain trustees to execute the charitable intentions expressed in the will of Archibald Hutchinson, of the Middle Temple, London, esquire, deceased.

=== Private acts ===
Short title, or popular name	Citation	Royal assent
Long title
Temple's Estate Act 1796	36 Geo. 3. c. 1 Pr. (I)	24 March 1796
An Act to enable the Right Honourable Richard Grenville Nugent Temple, commonly called Earl Temple, and the Right Honourable Anna Eliza Brydges, spinster, commonly called Lady Anna Eliza Brydges, to make settlements on the marriage intended between them, notwithstanding their respective minorities.
Cooper's Estate Act 1796	36 Geo. 3. c. 2 Pr. (I)	15 April 1796
An Act to amend an act of parliament made in the 21st year of the reign of his present majesty King George III, entitled, "An Act for the sale of a competent part of the settled estates of Arthur Cooper, esquire, Sarah Cooper, otherwise Carlton, and William Henry Cooper, esquire, for the payment of debts and other encumbrances affecting the same, and for other purposes therein mentioned." (Note: Cooper's Estate Act 1781 (21 & 22 Geo. 3. c. 4 Pr. (I)))

=== Sources ===
- "Acts of Parliament by Session: 1796". Irish Legislation Database. Queen's University Belfast.
- "Pre-Union Irish Statutes: 1796 Acts". Irish Statute Book. Attorney General of Ireland.

== 37 Geo. 3 (1797) ==
The 8th session of the 5th parliament of George III, which met from 13 October 1796 to 3 July 1797.

This session was also traditionally cited as 38 G. 3.

=== Public acts ===
Short title, or popular name	Citation	Royal assent
Long title
Habeas Corpus Suspension Act 1797 (repealed)	37 Geo. 3. c. 1 (I)	26 October 1796
An Act to empower the Lord Lieutenant or other chief governor or governors of Ireland to apprehend and detain such persons as he or they shall suspect for conspiring against his majesty's person and government. (Repealed by Statute Law Revision (Ireland) Act 1879 (42 & 43 Vict. c. 24))
Volunteers Act 1797 (repealed)	37 Geo. 3. c. 2 (I)	7 November 1796
An Act for encouraging and disciplining such corps of men as shall voluntarily enrol themselves under officers to be commissioned by his majesty, for the defence of this kingdom during the present war. (Repealed by Statute Law Revision (Ireland) Act 1879 (42 & 43 Vict. c. 24))
Duties and Trade Regulation Act 1797 (repealed)	37 Geo. 3. c. 3 (I)	25 March 1797
An Act for granting for one year, the several duties therein mentioned, in lieu of all other duties payable upon the articles therein specified during the said term, and for regulating the trade between this kingdom and his majesty's colonies, and for other purposes therein mentioned. (Repealed by Statute Law Revision (Ireland) Act 1879 (42 & 43 Vict. c. 24))
National Debt Act (Ireland) 1797 (repealed)	37 Geo. 3. c. 4 (I)	30 March 1797
An Act for securing the payment of the annuities and the interest upon the principal sums therein provided for, and towards the discharge of such principal sums in such manner as therein is directed, and for enabling the officers of his majesty's treasury to receive certain sums for a limited time, in manner therein mentioned, and for granting to his majesty a certain sum of money out of the consolidated fund, and for applying a certain sum of money therein mentioned, for the service of the year 1797, and for other purposes. (Repealed by Statute Law Revision (Ireland) Act 1879 (42 & 43 Vict. c. 24))
Bounties Act 1797 (repealed)	37 Geo. 3. c. 5 (I)	25 March 1797
An Act for regulating the payment of bounties on the exportation of certain manufactures of this kingdom. (Repealed by Statute Law Revision (Ireland) Act 1879 (42 & 43 Vict. c. 24))
Sugar Act 1797 (repealed)	37 Geo. 3. c. 6 (I)	25 March 1797
An Act for the reduction of drawbacks and bounties now allowed on the exportation of sugar. (Repealed by Statute Law Revision (Ireland) Act 1879 (42 & 43 Vict. c. 24))
Militia Act (Ireland) 1797 (repealed)	37 Geo. 3. c. 7 (I)	30 March 1797
An Act for defraying the charge of the pay and clothing of the militia for one year from the 25th day of March, 1797. (Repealed by Statute Law Revision (Ireland) Act 1879 (42 & 43 Vict. c. 24))
Leather Act 1797 (repealed)	37 Geo. 3. c. 8 (I)	30 March 1797
An Act for granting to his majesty the duties therein mentioned upon hides and skins and manufactures of leather. (Repealed by Statute Law Revision (Ireland) Act 1879 (42 & 43 Vict. c. 24))
Hearth Duty Act 1797 (repealed)	37 Geo. 3. c. 9 (I)	25 March 1797
An Act for granting to his majesty for one year the duties therein mentioned on fire hearths, in lieu of all duties payable on the same during the said term. (Repealed by Statute Law Revision (Ireland) Act 1879 (42 & 43 Vict. c. 24))
Armagh Injuries Compensation Act 1797 (repealed)	37 Geo. 3. c. 10 (I)	25 March 1797
An Act to enable certain inhabitants of the county of Armagh, who have been injured in their person or properties, to recover compensation for such injuries by presentment, notwithstanding the time by law prescribed for applying for such presentments be lapsed. (Repealed by Statute Law Revision (Ireland) Act 1879 (42 & 43 Vict. c. 24))
Postage Act 1797 (repealed)	37 Geo. 3. c. 11 (I)	25 March 1797
An Act for granting to his majesty, his heirs and successors, certain duties and rates upon the portage and conveyance of all letters and packets within this kingdom. (Repealed by Statute Law Revision (Ireland) Act 1879 (42 & 43 Vict. c. 24))
Stamps Act (Ireland) 1797 (repealed)	37 Geo. 3. c. 12 (I)	25 March 1797
An Act for granting to his majesty, his heirs and successors, several duties therein mentioned to be levied by the commissioners for managing the stamp duties. (Repealed by Statute Law Revision (Ireland) Act 1879 (42 & 43 Vict. c. 24))
Mutiny Act (Ireland) 1797 (repealed)	37 Geo. 3. c. 13 (I)	25 March 1797
An Act for punishing mutiny and desertion, and for the better payment of the army and their quarters within this kingdom. (Repealed by Statute Law Revision (Ireland) Act 1879 (42 & 43 Vict. c. 24))
Sugar Duty Act 1797 (repealed)	37 Geo. 3. c. 14 (I)	24 April 1797
An Act to prevent the excessive price of refined sugar in this kingdom. (Repealed by Statute Law Revision (Ireland) Act 1879 (42 & 43 Vict. c. 24))
Trade with the United States Act 1797 (repealed)	37 Geo. 3. c. 15 (I)	24 April 1797
An Act for further continuing an act, entitled, "An Act for facilitating the trade and intercourse between this kingdom and the United States of America." (Note: Trade with United States Act 1788 (28 Geo. 3. c. 18 (I))) (Repealed by Statute Law Revision (Ireland) Act 1879 (42 & 43 Vict. c. 24))
Distillers Act 1797 (repealed)	37 Geo. 3. c. 16 (I)	24 April 1797
An Act for regulating the trade of a distiller, and for securing the duties payable upon homemade spirits. (Repealed by Statute Law Revision (Ireland) Act 1879 (42 & 43 Vict. c. 24))
Wicklow Gold Mine Act 1797 (repealed)	37 Geo. 3. c. 17 (I)	24 April 1797
An Act to enable the lords commissioners of his majesty's treasury to conduct the working of a gold mine in the county of Wicklow, and for securing the profits thereof. (Repealed by Statute Law Revision (Ireland) Act 1879 (42 & 43 Vict. c. 24))
Sale of Salt Act 1797 (repealed)	37 Geo. 3. c. 18 (I)	24 April 1797
An Act to prevent exactions upon the sale of salt. (Repealed by Statute Law Revision (Ireland) Act 1879 (42 & 43 Vict. c. 24))
Militia (No. 2) Act (Ireland) 1797 (repealed)	37 Geo. 3. c. 19 (I)	24 April 1797
An Act to explain and amend the laws now in force relating to the militia of this kingdom. (Repealed by Militia (Ireland) Act 1809 (49 Geo. 3. c. 120))
Militia Subaltern Officers Act 1797 (repealed)	37 Geo. 3. c. 20 (I)	24 April 1797
An Act for making allowances in certain cases to subaltern officers of the militia in time of peace. (Repealed by Statute Law Revision (Ireland) Act 1879 (42 & 43 Vict. c. 24))
Game Act 1797	37 Geo. 3. c. 21 (I)	24 April 1797
An Act to amend the Game Laws.
Dublin Improvement Act 1797	37 Geo. 3. c. 22 (I)	24 April 1797
An Act to amend and continue an act passed in the 30th year of his present majesty's reign, entitled, "An Act to extend the powers of the corporation for paving, cleansing and lighting the streets of Dublin, and to enable the corporation to build a bridge across the Anna Liffey at Islandbridge," (Note: Dublin Streets Act 1790 (30 Geo. 3. c. 42 (I))) and to enable the corporation to borrow certain sum of money for the purposes therein mentioned.
Grand Jury Presentments Act 1797 (repealed)	37 Geo. 3. c. 23 (I)	24 April 1797
An Act to extend to presentments exceeding £200 to be expended on mail coach roads, the regulations of an act passed in the 35th year of the king, entitled, "An Act for the regulation of presentments, for the purpose of levying money to be expended in erecting court-houses, gaols and other expensive buildings." (Note: Grand Jury Presentments Act 1795 (35 Geo. 3. c. 7 (I))) (Repealed by Statute Law Revision (Ireland) Act 1879 (42 & 43 Vict. c. 24))
Corn Bounties Act 1797 (repealed)	37 Geo. 3. c. 24 (I)	24 April 1797
An Act for the further advancement of agriculture, and a steady supply of corn for the city of Dublin, by extending the export bounties on corn and flour to the said city, and discounting all inland, canal and coast bounties thereto. (Repealed by Statute Law Revision (Ireland) Act 1879 (42 & 43 Vict. c. 24))
Bankrupts Act 1797	37 Geo. 3. c. 25 (I)	24 April 1797
An Act for the relief of uncertified bankrupts.
Forgery Act 1797 (repealed)	37 Geo. 3. c. 26 (I)	24 April 1797
An Act to prevent the forging of notes and bills of the Governor and Company of the Bank of Ireland, and to prevent the obtaining of false credit, and the committing of frauds by the imitation of notes or bills of the said Governor and Company. (Repealed by Criminal Statutes Repeal Act 1861 (24 & 25 Vict. c. 95))
National Debt (No. 2) Act (Ireland) 1797 (repealed)	37 Geo. 3. c. 27 (I)	24 April 1797
An Act for vesting a certain fund in commissioners at the end of every quarter of a year, to be by them applied to the reduction of the national debt, and to direct the application of additional funds in case of future loans to the like purpose. (Repealed by Statute Law Revision (Ireland) Act 1879 (42 & 43 Vict. c. 24))
Duties, &c. Act 1797 (repealed)	37 Geo. 3. c. 28 (I)	24 April 1797
An Act for granting to his majesty a duty on auctions, on certain manufactures of glass and on paper hangings, and for granting further duties on the importation of corks, glauber salts and paper hangings, and a further duty on licences to keep malt houses, and for securing the duties granted on hides and skins tanned with shumack and dressed in oil, and for granting certain sums out of the surplus of the consolidated fund, for salaries to the professors of Italian, French, German, and Spanish languages in Trinity College, Dublin, and for granting certain duties and additional duties to be levied by the commissioners of stamp duties. (Repealed by Statute Law Revision (Ireland) Act 1879 (42 & 43 Vict. c. 24))
Road from Dublin to Ratoath Act 1797	37 Geo. 3. c. 29 (I)	24 April 1797
An Act for improving and repairing the roads from the city of Dublin to Ratoath and Curragha, and for altering and amending an act passed in the 35th year of his present majesty's reign, entitled, "An Act for making, widening and repairing the road leading from the city of Dublin to Ratoath, and for erecting turnpikes thereon in aid of barony presentments." (Note: Dublin and Ratoath Road Act 1795 (35 Geo. 3. c. 47 (I)))
Revenue Act 1797	37 Geo. 3. c. 30 (I)	6 June 1797
An Act for better regulating the collection of his majesty's revenue, and for preventing of frauds therein, and for repealing an act made in the 36th year of the reign of his present majesty, entitled, "An Act for continuing and amending the several laws relating to his majesty's revenue, and further preventing frauds therein," (Note: Revenue Act 1796 (36 Geo. 3. c. 35 (I))) and the several acts and statutes which are mentioned in the said act, and continued thereby.
Importation During the War Act 1797 (repealed)	37 Geo. 3. c. 31 (I)	6 June 1797
An Act for the more secure importation during a limited time, of the several goods and materials of manufacture therein mentioned. (Repealed by Statute Law Revision (Ireland) Act 1879 (42 & 43 Vict. c. 24))
National Debt (No. 3) Act (Ireland) 1797 (repealed)	37 Geo. 3. c. 32 (I)	6 June 1797
An Act for raising by loan the several sums therein mentioned, towards the supply granted to his majesty for the service of the year 1797, and for securing the payment of the interest thereof, and for enabling the commissioners of the treasury of Ireland, to receive from the commissioners of the treasury in England, the sums therein mentioned towards the said loan, and for securing an interest for the same, and to provide for the discharge of the said sum. (Repealed by Statute Law Revision (Ireland) Act 1879 (42 & 43 Vict. c. 24))
Malt Act 1797 (repealed)	37 Geo. 3. c. 33 (I)	6 June 1797
An Act for collecting and securing his majesty's revenue upon malt. (Repealed by Statute Law Revision (Ireland) Act 1879 (42 & 43 Vict. c. 24))
Dublin House of Industry Act 1797	37 Geo. 3. c. 34 (I)	6 June 1797
An Act for the better governing and managing the house of industry for the relief of the poor in Dublin.
Highways Act 1797 (repealed)	37 Geo. 3. c. 35 (I)	6 June 1797
An Act to amend an act passed in the 36th year of his present majesty's reign, entitled, "An Act for the amendment of public roads, for directing the powers of grand juries respecting presentments," (Note: Highways Act 1796 (36 Geo. 3. c. 55 (I))) and for repealing several laws heretofore made for those purposes, with respect to roads through bogs. (Repealed by Statute Law Revision (Ireland) Act 1879 (42 & 43 Vict. c. 24))
Trespass of Cattle Act 1797 (repealed)	37 Geo. 3. c. 36 (I)	6 June 1797
An Act to prevent the vexatious impounding of cattle for trespass or damage feasant, and for the more effectual preserving of meares and fences. (Repealed by Statute Law Revision (Ireland) Act 1879 (42 & 43 Vict. c. 24))
Chapels of Ease Act 1797 (repealed)	37 Geo. 3. c. 37 (I)	6 June 1797
An Act for amending an act passed in this kingdom in the 11th and 12th years of his present majesty, entitled, "An Act for erecting parochial chapels of ease in parishes of large extent, and making such chapels and those that are already erected perpetual cures, and for making a proper provision for the maintenance of perpetual curates to officiate in the same, and also in like manner for making appropriate parishes perpetual cures." (Note: Parochial Chapels (Ireland) Act 1771 (11 & 12 Geo. 3. c. 16 (I))) (Repealed by Statute Law Revision (Ireland) Act 1879 (42 & 43 Vict. c. 24))
Insurrection Act 1797	37 Geo. 3. c. 38 (I)	3 July 1797
An Act to explain an act passed in the 36th year of the reign of his present majesty, entitled, "An Act more effectually to suppress insurrections, and to prevent the disturbance of the public peace." (Note: Insurrection Act 1796 (36 Geo. 3. c. 20 (I)))
Indemnity and Insurrections Act 1797 (repealed)	37 Geo. 3. c. 39 (I)	3 July 1797
An Act for indemnifying such persons as have acted since the 1st day of January, 1797, for the preservation of the public peace, and suppression of the insurrections prevailing in some parts of this kingdom. (Repealed by Statute Law Revision (Ireland) Act 1879 (42 & 43 Vict. c. 24))
Incitement to Disaffection Act (Ireland) 1797 (repealed)	37 Geo. 3. c. 40 (I)	3 July 1797
An Act for the better Prevention and Punishment of Attempts to seduce Persons serving in His Majesty's Forces by Sea or Land from their Duty and Allegiance to His Majesty, or to incite them to Mutiny or Disobedience. (Repealed for the Republic of Ireland by Statute Law Revision (Pre-Union Irish Statutes) Act 1962 (No. 29) and for Northern Ireland by Statute Law (Repeals) Act 1998 (c. 43))
Dublin Society Act 1797 (repealed)	37 Geo. 3. c. 41 (I)	3 July 1797
An Act for directing the application of the sum of £5, 500 granted by parliament to the Dublin Society, for the improvement of husbandry and other useful arts. (Repealed by Statute Law Revision (Ireland) Act 1879 (42 & 43 Vict. c. 24))
Tobacco Act 1797	37 Geo. 3. c. 42 (I)	6 June 1797
An Act for regulating and extending the tobacco trade, and for securing the duties payable upon the import and manufacture of tobacco.
Stamp Act (Ireland) 1797 (repealed)	37 Geo. 3. c. 43 (I)	6 June 1797
An Act for the relief of persons who have omitted or may omit, inadvertently to pay certain stamp duties herein mentioned, on deeds or other instruments, and for ascertaining the duty payable on hats imported into this kingdom. (Repealed by Statute Law Revision (Ireland) Act 1879 (42 & 43 Vict. c. 24))
Parish Estates Act 1797 (repealed)	37 Geo. 3. c. 44 (I)	6 June 1797
An Act for the preservation of estates belonging to parishes. (Repealed by Statute Law Revision (Ireland) Act 1879 (42 & 43 Vict. c. 24))
Spirit Licences Act 1797	37 Geo. 3. c. 45 (I)	3 July 1797
An Act for regulating the issuing of licences for the sale of wine, ale, beer, cider and spirituous liquors by retail, and for preventing the immoderate use of spirituous liquors.
Distillers Act 1797 (repealed)	37 Geo. 3. c. 46 (I)	3 July 1797
An Act to regulate the trade of rectifying of spirits, and to subject distillers to certain regulations therein mentioned. (Repealed by Statute Law Revision (Ireland) Act 1879 (42 & 43 Vict. c. 24))
Parliamentary Elections Act 1797	37 Geo. 3. c. 47 (I)	3 July 1797
An Act for the further Regulation of the Election of Members to serve in Parliament. (Repealed for the Republic of Ireland by Statute Law Revision (Pre-Union Irish Statutes) Act 1962 (No. 29))
Relief of Insolvent Debtors Act (Ireland) 1797 (repealed)	37 Geo. 3. c. 48 (I)	3 July 1797
An Act for the Relief of Confined Debtors who may be Insolvent. (Repealed by Statute Law Revision (Ireland) Act 1879 (42 & 43 Vict. c. 24))
Insolvent Debtors Act 1797	37 Geo. 3. c. 49 (I)	3 July 1797
An Act for the relief and maintenance of insolvent persons detained in prison.
Bank of Ireland Act 1797^{(Republic of Ireland)}	37 Geo. 3. c. 50 (I)	3 July 1797
An Act for further extending the Provisions of an Act, passed in the Twenty-first and Twenty-second Years of His Majesty's Reign, entitled, "An Act for establishing a Bank, by the Name of the Governor and Company of the Bank of Ireland." (Note: Bank of Ireland Act 1781 (21 & 22 Geo. 3. c. 16 (I)))
Restriction on Cash Payments (Ireland) Act 1797 (repealed)	37 Geo. 3. c. 51 (I)	3 July 1797
An Act for confirming and continuing for a limited time, the restrictions contained in the minute of council of the second day of March, 1797, on payments in cash by the Bank. (Repealed by Statute Law Revision (Ireland) Act 1879 (42 & 43 Vict. c. 24))
Coffee Act 1797 (repealed)	37 Geo. 3. c. 52 (I)	6 June 1797
An Act for regulating the import, export, and sale of coffee, and for securing the duties payable thereupon. (Repealed by Statute Law Revision (Ireland) Act 1879 (42 & 43 Vict. c. 24))
Trade Regulation Act 1797 (repealed)	37 Geo. 3. c. 53 (I)	6 June 1797
An Act to regulate the export, import and sale of certain articles therein mentioned. (Repealed by Statute Law Revision (Ireland) Act 1879 (42 & 43 Vict. c. 24))
National Debt (No. 4) Act (Ireland) 1797	37 Geo. 3. c. 54 (I)	3 July 1797
An Act to enable the proprietors of debentures issued by government, to convert them into stock transferable at the Bank of Ireland.
Road from Dublin to Kilcullen Act 1797	37 Geo. 3. c. 55 (I)	3 July 1797
An Act to amend an act passed in the 27th year of his present majesty, entitled, "An Act for improving and repairing the turnpike road leading from the city of Dublin to Kilcullen-bridge in the county of Kildare, and to the 21 mile stone, westward of the said road." (Note: Road from Dublin to Kilcullen Act 1787 (27 Geo. 3. c. 60 (I)))
Borough of Drogheda Act 1797^{(Republic of Ireland)}	37 Geo. 3. c. 56 (I)	3 July 1797
An Act to amend an Act passed in the Thirtieth Year of His present Majesty’s Reign, Entitled, "An Act for the Improvement of the Port and Harbour of Drogheda, and the better Regulation of the Police of said Town." (Note: Port of Drogheda Act 1790 (30 Geo. 3. c. 39 (I)))
Indemnity Act (Ireland) 1797 (repealed)	37 Geo. 3. c. 57 (I)	3 July 1797
An Act for the relief of persons who have omitted to qualify themselves according to law. (Repealed by Statute Law Revision (Ireland) Act 1879 (42 & 43 Vict. c. 24))
Dublin Hackney Carriages Act 1797 (repealed)	37 Geo. 3. c. 58 (I)	3 July 1797
An Act for amending and reducing into one act of parliament the laws relating to hackney and other carriages plying in the city of Dublin, its suburbs and liberties, and within seven miles thereof. (Repealed by Dublin Carriage Act 1853 (16 & 17 Vict. c. 112))
Dublin Wide Streets Act 1797 (repealed)	37 Geo. 3. c. 59 (I)	3 July 1797
An Act for granting to the commissioners for making wide and convenient streets in Dublin, the sums therein mentioned for the purposes therein mentioned. (Repealed by Statute Law Revision (Ireland) Act 1879 (42 & 43 Vict. c. 24))
Annuity for the Princess Royal Act 1797 (repealed)	37 Geo. 3. c. 60 (I)	3 July 1797
An Act to enable his majesty to grant a certain pension to the Princess Royal, upon her intended marriage with the hereditary prince of Wirtemburgh. (Repealed by Statute Law Revision (Ireland) Act 1879 (42 & 43 Vict. c. 24))
Linen and Hempen Manufactures Act 1797	37 Geo. 3. c. 61 (I)	3 July 1797
An Act for the further regulation of the linen and hempen manufactures.
Sarah Hamilton's Annuity Act 1797 (repealed)	37 Geo. 3. c. 62 (I)	6 June 1797
An Act to enable his majesty to grant an annuity to certain trustees therein named, in trust for Sarah Hamilton, widow of the Reverend Doctor William Hamilton, deceased, and for the children of the said Sarah by the said William Hamilton. (Repealed by Statute Law Revision (Ireland) Act 1879 (42 & 43 Vict. c. 24))
Alice Knipe's Annuity Act 1797 (repealed)	37 Geo. 3. c. 63 (I)	3 July 1797
An Act to enable his majesty to grant an annuity to certain trustees therein named, in trust for Alice Knipe, widow of the Reverend George Knipe, deceased, and for the children of the said George Knipe, namely, John, George, Frances and Anne. (Repealed by Statute Law Revision (Ireland) Act 1879 (42 & 43 Vict. c. 24))

=== Private acts ===
Short title, or popular name	Citation	Royal assent
Long title
Earl of Westmeath's Divorce Act 1797	37 Geo. 3. c. 1 Pr. (I)	7 November 1796
An Act to dissolve the marriage of George Frederick, earl of Westmeath, with Ann, countess of Westmeath, his now wife, and to enable him to marry again.
Dennis' Estate Act 1797	37 Geo. 3. c. 2 Pr. (I)	24 April 1797
An Act to enable John Dennis, of the city of Dublin, esquire, barrister-at-law, now in possession, and after his decease the other persons next in remainder, under the will of the late James, lord baron Tracton, deceased, when they shall respectively be in possession, to make a lease or leases for lives renewable for ever, or for as long a tern as the said James, lord baron Tracton, in his lifetime could or might have made of part of the lands or Newton in the county of Dublin, containing by estimation 23 acres.
French's Estate Act 1797	37 Geo. 3. c. 3 Pr. (I)	24 April 1797
An Act to make good and valid in law a certain conveyance of lands, tenements and hereditaments in the county of Galway, executed by Thomas Walker, esquire, committee of John James Martin Francis French, an insane, to Bartholomew Basterot the purchaser thereof, under a decree of the court of chancery in Ireland.

=== Sources ===
- "Acts of Parliament by Session: 1797". Irish Legislation Database. Queen's University Belfast.
- "Pre-Union Irish Statutes: 1797 Acts". Irish Statute Book. Attorney General of Ireland.

== 38 Geo. 3 (1798) ==
The 1st session of the 6th parliament of George III, which met from 9 January 1798 to 6 October 1798.

This session was also traditionally cited as 38 G. 3.

=== Public acts ===
Short title, or popular name	Citation	Royal assent
Long title
Militia Act (Ireland) 1798 (repealed)	38 Geo. 3. c. 1 (I)	24 March 1798
An Act for defraying the charge of the pay and clothing of the militia for one year from the 25th day of March 1798. (Repealed by Statute Law Revision (Ireland) Act 1879 (42 & 43 Vict. c. 24))
Quo Warranto Act 1798^{(Republic of Ireland)} or the Quo Warranto Act (Ireland) 1798^{(Republic of Ireland)}	38 Geo. 3. c. 2 (I)	24 March 1798
An Act for the Amendment of the Law in Proceedings upon Information in Nature of quo warranto. (Repealed for Northern Ireland by Judicature (Northern Ireland) Act 1978 (c. 23))
Tyrone Presentments Act 1798 (repealed)	38 Geo. 3. c. 3 (I)	24 March 1798
An Act to repeal so much of an act passed in the 36th year of his present majesty's reign, entitled, "An Act for the amendment of public roads, for directing the powers of grand juries respecting presentments," (Note: Highways Act 1796 (36 Geo. 3. c. 55 (I))) and for repealing several laws heretofore made for those purposes, as relates to the accounting for public money in the county of Tyrone. (Repealed by Statute Law Revision (Ireland) Act 1879 (42 & 43 Vict. c. 24))
Portuguese Salt Act 1798 (repealed)	38 Geo. 3. c. 4 (I)	4 April 1798
An Act to permit the importation of salt into this kingdom in neutral vessels, for a time therein to be limited. (Repealed by Statute Law Revision (Ireland) Act 1879 (42 & 43 Vict. c. 24))
Duties and Trade Regulation Act 1798 (repealed)	38 Geo. 3. c. 5 (I)	24 March 1798
An Act for granting for one year the several duties therein mentioned, in lieu of all other duties payable upon the articles therein specified during the said term, and for regulating the trade between this kingdom and his majesty's colonies, and for other purposes therein mentioned. (Repealed by Statute Law Revision (Ireland) Act 1879 (42 & 43 Vict. c. 24))
Bounties on Exportation Act 1798 (repealed)	38 Geo. 3. c. 6 (I)	24 March 1798
An Act for regulating the payment of bounties on the exportation of certain manufactures of this kingdom. (Repealed by Statute Law Revision (Ireland) Act 1879 (42 & 43 Vict. c. 24))
Freedom of the Press Act 1798	38 Geo. 3. c. 7 (I)	4 April 1798
An Act to amend an Act passed in the Twenty third and Twenty-fourth Years of the Reign of His present Majesty, intituled "An Act to secure the Liberty of the Press by preventing the Abuses arising from the Publication of traitorous, seditious, false, and slanderous Libels by Persons unknown." (Note: (23 & 24 Geo. 3. c. 28 (I)))
Incitement to Disaffection Act (Ireland) 1798 (repealed)	38 Geo. 3. c. 8 (I)	4 April 1798
An Act to continue an act passed in the 37th year of his majesty's reign, entitled, "An Act for the better prevention and punishment of attempts to seduce persons serving in his majesty's forces by sea or land, from their duty and allegiance, or to incite them to mutiny or disobedience." (Note: Incitement to Disaffection Act (Ireland) 1797 (37 Geo. 3. c. 40 (I))) (Repealed by Statute Law Revision (Ireland) Act 1879 (42 & 43 Vict. c. 24))
Hearth Duty Act 1798 (repealed)	38 Geo. 3. c. 9 (I)	24 March 1798
An Act for granting to his majesty for one year the duties therein mentioned on fire hearths in lieu of all duties payable on the same during the said term. (Repealed by Statute Law Revision (Ireland) Act 1879 (42 & 43 Vict. c. 24))
National Debt Act 1798 (repealed)	38 Geo. 3. c. 10 (I)	24 March 1798
An Act for securing the payment of the annuities and of the interest of the principal sums therein provided for, and towards the discharge of such principal sums in such manner as therein directed, and for enabling the officers of his majesty's treasury to receive certain sums for a limited time in manner therein mentioned, and for granting to his majesty a certain sum of money out of the consolidated fund, and for applying a certain sum of money therein mentioned for the service of the year 1798, and for other purposes. (Repealed by Statute Law Revision (Ireland) Act 1879 (42 & 43 Vict. c. 24))
Malt Duty Act 1798 (repealed)	38 Geo. 3. c. 11 (I)	4 April 1798
An Act to continue an act passed in the 37th year of his majesty's reign, entitled, "An Act for collecting and securing his majesty's revenue on malt." (Note: Malt Act 1797 (37 Geo. 3. c. 33 (I))) (Repealed by Statute Law Revision (Ireland) Act 1879 (42 & 43 Vict. c. 24))
Coffee Duty Act 1798 (repealed)	38 Geo. 3. c. 12 (I)	4 April 1798
An Act to continue an act passed in the 37th year of his majesty's reign, entitled, "An Act for regulating the import, export and sale of coffee, and securing the duties payable thereon." (Note: Coffee Act 1797 (37 Geo. 3. c. 52 (I))) (Repealed by Statute Law Revision (Ireland) Act 1879 (42 & 43 Vict. c. 24))
Trade with the United States Act 1798 (repealed)	38 Geo. 3. c. 13 (I)	24 March 1798
An Act for further continuing an act, entitled, "An Act for facilitating the trade and intercourse between this kingdom and the United States of America." (Note: Trade with United States Act 1788 (28 Geo. 3. c. 18 (I))) (Repealed by Statute Law Revision (Ireland) Act 1879 (42 & 43 Vict. c. 24))
Habeas Corpus Suspension Act 1798 (repealed)	38 Geo. 3. c. 14 (I)	24 March 1798
For continuing an act passed in the 37th year of his majesty's reign, entitled, "An Act to empower the lord lieutenant, or other chief governor or governors of Ireland, to apprehend and detain such persons as he or they shall suspect for conspiring against his majesty's persons and government." (Note: Habeas Corpus Suspension Act 1797 (37 Geo. 3. c. 1 (I))) (Repealed by Statute Law Revision (Ireland) Act 1879 (42 & 43 Vict. c. 24))
Postage Act 1798 (repealed)	38 Geo. 3. c. 15 (I)	24 March 1798
An Act for granting to his majesty, his heirs and successors for one year from 25 March 1798 certain duties and rates upon the portage and conveyance of all letters and packets within this kingdom. (Repealed by Statute Law Revision (Ireland) Act 1879 (42 & 43 Vict. c. 24))
Alien Act Continuance Act 1798 (repealed)	38 Geo. 3. c. 16 (I)	4 April 1798
An Act for continuing an act passed in the 33rd year of his majesty's reign, entitled, "An Act for establishing regulations respecting aliens arriving in this kingdom or resident therein in certain cases, and subjects of this kingdom who have served or are serving in foreign armies," (Note: Alien Act 1793 (33 Geo. 3. c. 1 (I))) and for continuing another act passed in the 36th year of his present majesty, entitled, "An Act to prevent the importation of arms, gunpowder and ammunition into this kingdom, and the making and removing, selling and keeping of gunpowder, arms and ammunition without licence." (Note: Arms Act 1796 (36 Geo. 3. c. 42 (I))) (Repealed by Statute Law Revision (Ireland) Act 1879 (42 & 43 Vict. c. 24))
Voluntary Contributions Act 1798 (repealed)	38 Geo. 3. c. 17 (I)	4 April 1798
To enable his majesty to receive voluntary contributions of his subjects for the defence of this kingdom. (Repealed by Statute Law Revision (Ireland) Act 1879 (42 & 43 Vict. c. 24))
Stamp Act (Ireland) 1798 (repealed)	38 Geo. 3. c. 18 (I)	24 March 1798
An Act for granting to his majesty, his heirs and successors the several duties therein mentioned, to be levied by the commissioners for managing the stamp duties. (Repealed by Statute Law Revision (Ireland) Act 1879 (42 & 43 Vict. c. 24))
Indemnity Act (Ireland) 1798 (repealed)	38 Geo. 3. c. 19 (I)	4 April 1798
For indemnifying such persons as have acted since the third day of July, in 1797 for the preservation of the public peace, and suppression of the insurrections prevailing in some parts of this kingdom. (Repealed by Statute Law Revision (Ireland) Act 1879 (42 & 43 Vict. c. 24))
Demise of the Crown Act 1798 (repealed)	38 Geo. 3. c. 20 (I)	4 April 1798
An Act to shorten the time now required for giving notice of the royal intention of his majesty, his heirs and successors, that the parliament shall meet and be holden for the dispatch of business, and for more effectually to provide for the meeting of parliament, in the case of a demise of the crown. (Repealed by Statute Law Revision (Ireland) Act 1879 (42 & 43 Vict. c. 24))
Insurrections (Continuance) Act 1798	38 Geo. 3. c. 21 (I)	4 April 1798
An Act for continuing an act passed in the 36th year of the his majesty's reign, entitled, "An Act more effectually to suppress insurrections, and to prevent the disturbance of the public peace," (Note: Insurrection Act 1796 (36 Geo. 3. c. 20 (I))) and also an act passed in the 37th year of his majesty's reign, (Note: Insurrection Act 1797 (37 Geo. 3. c. 38 (I))) entitled, "An Act to explain an act passed in the 36th year of the his majesty's reign, entitled, 'An Act more effectually to suppress insurrections, and to prevent the disturbance of the public peace.'"
Road in Cork Act 1798	38 Geo. 3. c. 22 (I)	24 March 1798
An Act for improving and repairing the turnpike road leading from the city of Cork to the brook, which bounds the counties of Cork and Tipperary, near the foot of Kilworth Mountain, and for repealing the several laws heretofore made relating to the said road.
Leather Trade Act 1798 (repealed)	38 Geo. 3. c. 23 (I)	24 March 1798
An Act for granting to his majesty the duties therein mentioned upon hides and skins tanned, and on hides and skins dressed in oil, and upon vellum and parchment, and upon manufactures of leather. (Repealed by Statute Law Revision (Ireland) Act 1879 (42 & 43 Vict. c. 24))
Auctions, &c. Act 1798 (repealed)	38 Geo. 3. c. 24 (I)	24 March 1798
An Act to secure the collection of the duties on auctions and glass bottles made in this kingdom, and on paper printed, painted or stained in this kingdom, to serve for hangings or other uses, and to prevent frauds therein. (Repealed by Statute Law Revision (Ireland) Act 1879 (42 & 43 Vict. c. 24))
Civil Bill Courts Act 1798 (repealed)	38 Geo. 3. c. 25 (I)	4 April 1798
An Act to amend an act passed in the 36th year of his present majesty, (Note: Civil Bill Courts Act 1796 (36 Geo. 3. c. 25 (I))) entitled, "An Act for the better and more convenient administration of justice, and for the recovery of small debts in a summary way at the sessions of the peace of the several counties at large within this kingdom, except the county of Dublin, and for continuing and amending an act, (Note: Peace Preservation Act 1787 (27 Geo. 3. c. 40 (I))) entitled, 'An Act for the better execution of the law, and preservation of the peace within counties at large.'" (Repealed by Civil Bill Courts (Ireland) Act 1851 (14 & 15 Vict. c. 57))
Oyer and Terminer Act 1798	38 Geo. 3. c. 26 (I)	4 April 1798
An Act to empower the Justices of Oyer and Terminer, and Gaol Delivery, for the County of Dublin, and for the County of the City of Dublin, to continue to hold a Sessions of Oyer and Terminer, and Gaol Delivery, begun to be holden before the Essoign Day of Term, notwithstanding the Sitting of the Court of King's Bench, in either of the said Counties, and to enable all Judges of Assize, and Commissioners of Oyer and Terminer, to order persons in execution to attend before them as witnesses. (Repealed for the Republic of Ireland by Statute Law Revision (Pre-Union Irish Statutes) Act 1962 (No. 29))
Mutiny Act (Ireland) 1798 (repealed)	38 Geo. 3. c. 27 (I)	24 March 1798
An Act for punishing mutiny and desertion, and for the better payment of the army and their quarters within this kingdom. (Repealed by Statute Law Revision (Ireland) Act 1879 (42 & 43 Vict. c. 24))
Road in Down and Antrim Act 1798	38 Geo. 3. c. 28 (I)	4 June 1798
An Act to amend the mail coach road leading from Banbridge to Belfast.
Paper Duties Act 1798	38 Geo. 3. c. 29 (I)	4 June 1798
An Act to secure the collection of the duties on paper made in Ireland, and to prevent frauds therein.
Princess Royal's Pension (British Currency) Act 1798 (repealed)	38 Geo. 3. c. 30 (I)	4 June 1798
An Act to amend an Act passed in the last Session of Parliament, entitled "An Act to entitle His Majesty to grant a certain Pension to the Princess Royal, upon Her intended Marriage with the Hereditary Prince of Wirtemburgh." (Note: Annuity for the Princess Royal Act 1797 (37 Geo. 3. c. 60 (I))) (Repealed by Statute Law Revision (Ireland) Act 1879 (42 & 43 Vict. c. 24))
Roads in Dublin County Act 1798	38 Geo. 3. c. 31 (I)	4 June 1798
An Act for amending the road from Dublin to Knocksedan, in the county of Dublin.
Loan Act 1798 (repealed)	38 Geo. 3. c. 32 (I)	4 June 1798
An Act for raising by Loan, as a Supply to His Majesty, the Sums therein mentioned, for the purposes therein mentioned. (Repealed by Statute Law Revision (Ireland) Act 1879 (42 & 43 Vict. c. 24))
Loan (No. 2) Act 1798 (repealed)	38 Geo. 3. c. 33 (I)	4 June 1798
An Act for raising by loan a sum not exceeding £200,080, in part of the sum of £2,366,746.13.4, authorized to be raised by loan, towards raising the supply granted to his majesty for the service of the year 1798. (Repealed by Statute Law Revision (Ireland) Act 1879 (42 & 43 Vict. c. 24))
Loan (No. 3) Act 1798	38 Geo. 3. c. 34 (I)	4 June 1798
An Act for raising by loan, as a supply to his majesty the sum therein mentioned, for the purposes therein mentioned.
Dublin Workhouse, &c. Act 1798 or the Dublin House of Industry Act 1798 (repealed)	38 Geo. 3. c. 35 (I)	4 June 1798
An Act for the better Management of the Workhouse and Foundling Hospital in Dublin. (Repealed by Statute Law Revision (Ireland) Act 1879 (42 & 43 Vict. c. 24))
House of Commons Disqualification Act 1798	38 Geo. 3. c. 36 (I)	4 June 1798
An Act for amending an Act passed in the Thirty-third Year of His Majesty's Reign, Entitled, "An Act for securing the Freedom and Independence of the House of Commons, by excluding therefrom Persons holding any Offices under the Crown, to be hereafter created, or holding certain Offices therein enumerated, or Pensions for Terms of Years, or during His Majesty's Pleasure." (Note: House of Commons Disqualification Act 1793 (33 Geo. 3. c. 41 (I))) (Repealed for the Republic of Ireland by Statute Law Revision (Pre-Union Irish Statutes) Act 1962 (No. 29))
Foreign Troops (Quartering) Act 1798 (repealed)	38 Geo. 3. c. 37 (I)	4 June 1798
An Act to make provision for quartering such foreign troops as his majesty may think proper to employ in this kingdom for the defence thereof. (Repealed by Statute Law Revision (Ireland) Act 1879 (42 & 43 Vict. c. 24))
Dublin Oyer and Terminer Act 1798 (repealed)	38 Geo. 3. c. 38 (I)	4 June 1798
An Act to enable commissioners of oyer and terminer and gaol delivery in and for the county and county of the city of Dublin, to commence, hold and continue their sessions during term. (Repealed by Statute Law Revision (Ireland) Act 1879 (42 & 43 Vict. c. 24))
Proctors' Bills of Costs Act 1798 (repealed)	38 Geo. 3. c. 39 (I)	4 June 1798
An Act for the better ascertaining the Amount, and securing the Payment of the Bills of Cost of Proctors, employed in carrying on, and defending Suits and transacting Business in the High Court of Admiralty, in His Majesty's Court of Prerogative, in the Court of Delegates, and in all Ecclesiastical Courts within the Kingdom of Ireland. (Repealed for the Republic of Ireland by Statute Law Revision (Pre-Union Irish Statutes) Act 1962 (No. 29) and for Northern Ireland by the Statute Law Revision Act 1950 (14 Geo. 6. c. 6))
Irish Mine Company Act 1798	38 Geo. 3. c. 40 (I)	4 June 1798
An Act for the better enabling certain persons to open and work mines, and to raise coal, culm, minerals and fossils within this kingdom, and for working and manufacturing the same.
Dublin Bridge Tolls Act 1798	38 Geo. 3. c. 41 (I)	4 June 1798
An Act for granting certain tolls, rates and duties to be taken at the turnpikes on the roads leading over Ballybough and Annesley Bridges, in aid of barony presentments, and in lieu of the tolls formerly payable at such turnpikes, and for amending the laws for making, widening and repairing the said roads, and for making perpetual the several acts of parliament relating thereto.
Sugar Act 1798 (repealed)	38 Geo. 3. c. 42 (I)	6 July 1798
An Act for the reduction of drawbacks on bounties now allowed on the exportation of sugar, and to prevent the excessive price of refined sugar in this kingdom. (Repealed by Statute Law Revision (Ireland) Act 1879 (42 & 43 Vict. c. 24))
Dublin Society Act 1798 (repealed)	38 Geo. 3. c. 43 (I)	6 October 1798
An Act for directing the application of the sum of £5,500 granted by parliament to the Dublin Society for the improvement of husbandry and other useful arts. (Repealed by Statute Law Revision (Ireland) Act 1879 (42 & 43 Vict. c. 24))
Linen and Hempen Manufactures Act 1798 (repealed)	38 Geo. 3. c. 44 (I)	6 October 1798
An Act to amend the laws for promoting the linen and hempen manufactures. (Repealed by Statute Law Revision (Ireland) Act 1879 (42 & 43 Vict. c. 24))
Servants, Hearths, and Carriages Duties Act 1798 (repealed)	38 Geo. 3. c. 45 (I)	6 October 1798
An Act to regulate the collection of the duties on male servants, and to secure the payment thereof, and for the better collection of the duties on fire hearths, and on coaches and other carriages. (Repealed by Statute Law Revision (Ireland) Act 1879 (42 & 43 Vict. c. 24))
English Militia Act 1798 (repealed)	38 Geo. 3. c. 46 (I)	6 July 1798
An Act for the government of the militia of Great Britain serving in this kingdom during their continuance therein. (Repealed by Statute Law Revision (Ireland) Act 1879 (42 & 43 Vict. c. 24))
Post Office Act 1798	38 Geo. 3. c. 47 (I)	6 October 1798
An Act for the further amendment of the acts relating to the post office, and for further facilitating prosecutions under the said acts.
Seamen Desertion Act 1798 (repealed)	38 Geo. 3. c. 48 (I)	6 October 1798
An Act for preventing the desertion of seamen from Irish merchant ships trading to his majesty's colonies and plantations in the West Indies. (Repealed by Statute Law Revision (Ireland) Act 1879 (42 & 43 Vict. c. 24))
King's Inns Act 1798^{(Republic of Ireland)}	38 Geo. 3. c. 49 (I)	6 October 1798
An Act to enable the Dean and Chapter of Christ Church, Dublin, and other Persons therein named, to grant certain Grounds in the City of Dublin, to the Society of King’s Inns, Dublin.
Fines and Recognizances Act 1798	38 Geo. 3. c. 50 (I)	6 October 1798
An Act for the better collections of sums arising from forfeited recognizances, and from fines imposed at assizes, commissions of oyer and terminer and general gaol delivery, and sessions of the peace, and for the future application of the same.
Distillers Act 1798	38 Geo. 3. c. 51 (I)	6 October 1798
An Act for regulating the trade of a distiller, and for securing the duties payable upon homemade spirits.
Rectifying of Spirits Act 1798 (repealed)	38 Geo. 3. c. 52 (I)	6 October 1798
An Act to regulate the Trade of rectifying Spirits, and to prevent Frauds on His Majesty's Revenue by Rectifiers of Spirits. (Repealed by Statute Law Revision (Ireland) Act 1879 (42 & 43 Vict. c. 24))
Bank of Ireland Forgery Act 1798	38 Geo. 3. c. 53 (I)	6 October 1798
An Act for the more effectually preventing the forging of the bank notes and bills of the Governor and Company of the Bank of Ireland, and the circulation of forged notes and bills of the said Governor and Company.
Royal Canal Company Act 1798	38 Geo. 3. c. 54 (I)	6 October 1798
An Act for the better regulation of the Royal Canal company.
General Pardon Act 1798 (repealed)	38 Geo. 3. c. 55 (I)	6 October 1798
An Act for the king's most gracious, general and free pardon. (Repealed by Statute Law Revision (Ireland) Act 1879 (42 & 43 Vict. c. 24))
Public Accounts Act 1798	38 Geo. 3. c. 56 (I)	6 October 1798
An Act for the better regulation and examination of the public accounts.
Conspiracy to Murder Act 1798 (repealed)	38 Geo. 3. c. 57 (I)	6 October 1798
An Act to amend an act passed in the 36th year of his present majesty, entitled, "An Act to make conspiracy to murder felony without benefit of clergy." (Note: Conspiracy to Murder Act 1796 (36 Geo. 3. c. 27 (I))) (Repealed by Offences Against the Person (Ireland) Act 1829 (10 Geo. 4. c. 34))
English Loan Act 1798 (repealed)	38 Geo. 3. c. 58 (I)	6 October 1798
An Act to enable the commissioners of the treasury in Ireland to receive from the commissioners of the treasury in England the sum therein mentioned as a loan, in part of the supply granted to his majesty, and for securing the interest and charges thereon, and on a sum of £1,500,000, British currency, therein mentioned. (Repealed by Statute Law Revision (Ireland) Act 1879 (42 & 43 Vict. c. 24))
Transportation Act 1798 (repealed)	38 Geo. 3. c. 59 (I)	6 October 1798
An Act to remove doubts respecting the property in the service of persons transported from this kingdom. (Repealed by Statute Law Revision (Ireland) Act 1879 (42 & 43 Vict. c. 24))
Corporations Act 1798 (repealed)	38 Geo. 3. c. 60 (I)	6 October 1798
An Act for quieting Corporations. (Repealed by Statute Law Revision (Ireland) Act 1879 (42 & 43 Vict. c. 24))
Controverted Elections Act 1798 (repealed)	38 Geo. 3. c. 61 (I)	6 October 1798
An Act for better enforcing the execution of the acts made for the trials of controverted elections of members to serve in parliament, by disqualifying certain persons who have endeavoured to obstruct the due execution thereof, from voting at any election hereafter. (Repealed by Statute Law Revision (Ireland) Act 1879 (42 & 43 Vict. c. 24))
Militia (No. 2) Act (Ireland) 1798 (repealed)	38 Geo. 3. c. 62 (I)	6 October 1798
An Act to further explain and amend the laws now in force relating to the militia of this kingdom. (Repealed by Militia (Ireland) Act 1809 (49 Geo. 3. c. 120))
Tobacco Trade Act 1798 (repealed)	38 Geo. 3. c. 63 (I)	6 October 1798
An Act to continue an act passed in the 37th year of his majesty's reign, entitled, "An Act for regulating and extending the tobacco trade, and for securing the duties payable on the import and manufacture of tobacco." (Note: Tobacco Act 1797 (37 Geo. 3. c. 42 (I))) (Repealed by Statute Law Revision (Ireland) Act 1879 (42 & 43 Vict. c. 24))
Dublin Foundling Hospital Act 1798 (repealed)	38 Geo. 3. c. 64 (I)	6 October 1798
An Act to authorise the issuing and payment of the sum of £5,000, granted as a further supply for the foundling hospital and workhouse in the city of Dublin. (Repealed by Statute Law Revision (Ireland) Act 1879 (42 & 43 Vict. c. 24))
Chairman of Quarter Sessions in Dublin Act 1798 (repealed)	38 Geo. 3. c. 65 (I)	6 October 1798
An Act to enable the chief governor of this kingdom, to appoint one of his majesty's counsel learned in the law to be chairman of the sessions of the peace in the county of Dublin, during good behaviour. (Repealed by Civil Bill Courts (Ireland) Act 1851 (14 & 15 Vict. c. 57))
Annuity for Robert Boyd Act 1798 (repealed)	38 Geo. 3. c. 66 (I)	6 October 1798
An Act to enable his majesty to grant an annuity of £1,600 per annum to Robert Boyd, for his services as a judge. (Repealed by Statute Law Revision (Ireland) Act 1879 (42 & 43 Vict. c. 24))
Export and Import Act 1798 (repealed)	38 Geo. 3. c. 67 (I)	6 October 1798
An Act to continue an act passed in the 37th year of his majesty's reign, entitled, "An Act to regulate the export, import and sale of certain articles therein mentioned." (Note: Trade Regulation Act 1797 (37 Geo. 3. c. 53 (I))) (Repealed by Statute Law Revision (Ireland) Act 1879 (42 & 43 Vict. c. 24))
Rebellion Losses Commission Act 1798 (repealed)	38 Geo. 3. c. 68 (I)	6 October 1798
An Act for appointing commissioners to enquire into the losses of such of his majesty's loyal subjects as have been sufferers in their property during the subsisting rebellion in this kingdom. (Repealed by Statute Law Revision (Ireland) Act 1879 (42 & 43 Vict. c. 24))
Annuity for the Prince of Mecklenburgh Strelitz Act 1798 (repealed)	38 Geo. 3. c. 69 (I)	6 October 1798
An Act to enable his majesty to grant an annuity for the life of his serene highness the prince of Mecklenburgh Strelitz, nephew to the queen. (Repealed by Statute Law Revision (Ireland) Act 1879 (42 & 43 Vict. c. 24))
Annuity for Viscount Duncan Act 1798 (repealed)	38 Geo. 3. c. 70 (I)	6 October 1798
An Act for settling and securing a certain annuity on Adam, Lord Viscount Duncan, and the two next persons to whom the title of Viscount Duncan shall descend, in consideration of the eminent service performed by the said Adam, Viscount Duncan, to his majesty and the public. (Repealed by Statute Law Revision (Ireland) Act 1879 (42 & 43 Vict. c. 24))
Annuity for Earl Saint Vincent Act 1798	38 Geo. 3. c. 71 (I)	6 October 1798
An Act for settling and securing a certain annuity on John, Earl St Vincent, and the two next persons to whom the title of Earl St Vincent shall descend, in consideration of the eminent service performed by the said John Earl St Vincent to his majesty and the public.
Quitrents and Crown Lands Act 1798	38 Geo. 3. c. 72 (I)	6 October 1798
An Act for sale of his majesty's quit rents, crown and other rents, and of the lands forfeited in the years 1641 and 1688, and other lands yet remaining undisposed of, in such manner, and under such provisions as are therein mentioned.
Spirit Licences Act 1798	38 Geo. 3. c. 73 (I)	6 October 1798
An Act for continuing and amending an act passed in the last session of parliament, entitled, "An Act for regulating the issuing of licences for the sale of wine, ale and spirituous liquors by retail," (Note: Spirit Licences Act 1797 (37 Geo. 3. c. 45 (I))) and for preventing the immoderate use of spirituous liquors, and for granting to his majesty, his heirs and successors the duties therein mentioned.
Indemnity (No. 2) Act (Ireland) 1798 (repealed)	38 Geo. 3. c. 74 (I)	6 October 1798
An Act for indemnifying such persons as have acted since the first day of November, 1797, for the preservation of the public peace and suppression of insurrections prevailing in some parts of this kingdom. (Repealed by Statute Law Revision (Ireland) Act 1879 (42 & 43 Vict. c. 24))
Revenue Act 1798	38 Geo. 3. c. 75 (I)	6 October 1798
An Act for continuing and amending an act made in the 37th year of his majesty's reign, (Note: Revenue Act 1797 (37 Geo. 3. c. 30 (I))) entitled, "An Act for better regulating the collection of his majesty's revenue, and for preventing of frauds therein, and for repealing an act made in the 36th year of the reign of his present majesty, (Note: Revenue Act 1796 (36 Geo. 3. c. 35 (I))) entitled, 'An Act for continuing and amending the several laws relating to his majesty's revenue, and further preventing frauds therein,' and the several acts and statutes which are mentioned in the said act and continued thereby."
Indemnity (No. 3) Act (Ireland) 1798 (repealed)	38 Geo. 3. c. 76 (I)	6 October 1798
An Act for the relief of persons who have omitted to qualify themselves according to law. (Repealed by Statute Law Revision (Ireland) Act 1879 (42 & 43 Vict. c. 24))
Attainder Act 1798	38 Geo. 3. c. 77 (I)	6 October 1798
An Act for the attainder of Edward Fitzgerald, commonly called Lord Edward Fitzgerald, Cornelius Grogan, and Beauchamp Bagnal Harvey, deceased, of high treason.
Transportation Act 1798 (repealed)	38 Geo. 3. c. 78 (I)	6 October 1798
An Act to prevent persons from returning to his majesty's dominions who have been or shall be transported, banished or exiled on account of the present rebellion, and to prohibit them from passing into any country at war with his majesty. (Repealed by Statute Law Revision (Ireland) Act 1879 (42 & 43 Vict. c. 24))
Grand and Royal Canals Act 1798	38 Geo. 3. c. 79 (I)	6 October 1798
An Act to authorize the issuing of treasury bills to the amount therein mentioned to the company of the Grand Canal, to carry on a navigation to the River Shannon, and to authorize the issuing of debentures to the amount therein mentioned, to enable the company of the Royal Canal to proceed in carrying on the said canal.
Rebellion Attainder Act 1798 (repealed)	38 Geo. 3. c. 80 (I)	6 October 1798
An Act to compel certain persons who have been engaged in the late rebellion which hath broken out in this kingdom to surrender themselves, and abide their trials respectively, within a limited time, on pain of being attainted of high treason. (Repealed by Statute Law Revision (Ireland) Act 1879 (42 & 43 Vict. c. 24))
House of Commons Journals Act 1798 (repealed)	38 Geo. 3. c. 81 (I)	6 October 1798
An Act for authorizing the payment of the sums therein mentioned, granted for defraying the expense of reprinting the journals of the house of commons, and making indexes thereto. (Repealed by Statute Law Revision (Ireland) Act 1879 (42 & 43 Vict. c. 24))
Insurrections Act 1798	38 Geo. 3. c. 82 (I)	6 October 1798
An Act for amending an act passed in the 36th year of the reign of his majesty, entitled, "An Act more effectually to suppress insurrections, and to prevent the disturbance of the public peace." (Note: Insurrection Act 1796 (36 Geo. 3. c. 20 (I)))
Dublin to Kilcullen Road Act 1798	38 Geo. 3. c. 83 (I)	6 October 1798
An Act to explain and reduce into one act the several laws for making, improving and repairing the turnpike road leading from the city of Dublin to Kilcullenbridge in the county of Kildare, and to the 21 mile stone westward of the said bridge, and for prolonging the duration of the act (Note: Roads in Queen's County, &c. Act 1793 (33 Geo. 3. c. 32) for repairing the road for Naas to Limerick, and for the further improvement of the road from Kilworth Mountain to the city of Cork.

=== Private acts ===
Short title, or popular name	Citation	Royal assent
Long title
Duke of Leinster's Estate Act 1798	38 Geo. 3. c. 1 Pr. (I)	4 June 1798
An Act for raising a sufficient sum of money for discharging the debts and encumbrances affecting the settled estates of William, duke of Leinster, and to enable the said duke to make out a more effectual title to a purchaser or purchasers, mortgagee or mortgagees of such lands as shall be sold or mortgaged for the purposes aforesaid.
Mullins' Estate Act 1798	38 Geo. 3. c. 2 Pr. (I)	6 October 1798
An Act to bar the limitations of the settlement executed on the marriage of William Townsend Mullins, esquire, with Frances Elizabeth Sage, in consequence of the dissolution of the said marriage.

=== Sources ===
- "Acts of Parliament by Session: 1798". Irish Legislation Database. Queen's University Belfast.
- "Pre-Union Irish Statutes: 1798 Acts". Irish Statute Book. Attorney General of Ireland.

== 39 Geo. 3 (1799) ==
The 2nd session of the 6th parliament of George III, which met from 22 January 1799 to 1 June 1799.

This session was also traditionally cited as 39 G. 3.

=== Public acts ===
Short title, or popular name	Citation	Royal assent
Long title
Militia Act (Ireland) 1799 (repealed)	39 Geo. 3. c. 1 (I)	25 March 1799
An Act for defraying the charge of the pay and clothing of the militia for one year, from the 25th day of March 1799. (Repealed by Statute Law Revision (Ireland) Act 1879 (42 & 43 Vict. c. 24))
Export Bounties Act 1799 (repealed)	39 Geo. 3. c. 2 (I)	25 March 1799
An Act for regulating the payment of bounties on the exportation of certain manufactures of this kingdom. (Repealed by Statute Law Revision (Ireland) Act 1879 (42 & 43 Vict. c. 24))
Indemnity Act (Ireland) 1799 (repealed)	39 Geo. 3. c. 3 (I)	25 March 1799
An Act for indemnifying such persons as have acted since the 6th day of October 1798, for the preservation of the public peace, and the suppression of the insurrections prevailing in some parts of this kingdom. (Repealed by Statute Law Revision (Ireland) Act 1879 (42 & 43 Vict. c. 24))
Expiring Laws Continuance Act 1799 (repealed)	39 Geo. 3. c. 4 (I)	25 March 1799
An Act for continuing an act passed in the 33rd year of his majesty's reign, (Note: Alien Act 1793 (33 Geo. 3. c. 1 (I))) entitled, "An Act for establishing regulations respecting aliens arriving in this kingdom, or resident therein in certain cases, and subjects of this kingdom, who have served or are serving in foreign armies, and for continuing another act passed in the 36th year of his majesty's reign, (Note: Arms Act 1796 (36 Geo. 3. c. 42 (I))) entitled, "An Act to prevent the importation of arms, gunpowder and ammunition into this kingdom, and making and removing, selling and keeping of gunpowder, arms and ammunition without licence, and also for continuing several statutes therein recited, for more effectually suppressing insurrections, and preventing the disturbance of the public peace. (Repealed by Statute Law Revision (Ireland) Act 1879 (42 & 43 Vict. c. 24))
Stamp Act (Ireland) 1799 (repealed)	39 Geo. 3. c. 5 (I)	25 March 1799
An Act for granting to his majesty, his heirs and successors the several duties therein mentioned, to be levied by the commissioners for managing the stamp duties. (Repealed by Statute Law Revision (Ireland) Act 1879 (42 & 43 Vict. c. 24))
Mutiny Act (Ireland) 1799 (repealed)	39 Geo. 3. c. 6 (I)	25 March 1799
An Act for punishing mutiny and desertion, and for the better payment of the army and their quarters within this kingdom. (Repealed by Statute Law Revision (Ireland) Act 1879 (42 & 43 Vict. c. 24))
National Debt Act (Ireland) 1799 (repealed)	39 Geo. 3. c. 7 (I)	25 March 1799
An Act for securing the payment of the annuities, and of the interest of the principal sums therein provided for, and towards the discharge of such principal sums, in such manner as therein directed, and for enabling the officers of his majesty's treasury to receive certain sums for a limited time in manner therein mentioned, and for granting to his majesty a certain sum of money out of the consolidated fund, and for applying a certain sum of money therein mentioned, for the service of the year 1799, and for other purposes. (Repealed by Statute Law Revision (Ireland) Act 1879 (42 & 43 Vict. c. 24))
National Debt, Duties etc. Act 1799 (repealed)	39 Geo. 3. c. 8 (I)	25 March 1799
An Act for granting for one year the several duties therein mentioned, in lieu of all other duties payable upon the articles therein specified, during the said term, and for regulating the trade between this kingdom and his majesty's colonies, and for other purposes therein mentioned. (Repealed by Statute Law Revision (Ireland) Act 1879 (42 & 43 Vict. c. 24))
Barony of Idrone Act 1799^{(Republic of Ireland)}	39 Geo. 3. c. 9 (I)	25 March 1799
An Act for the Division of the Barony of Idrone, in the County of Carlow.
Postage Act (Ireland) 1799 (repealed)	39 Geo. 3. c. 10 (I)	25 March 1799
An Act for granting to his majesty, his heirs and successors certain duties and rates upon the portage and conveyance of all letters and packets within this kingdom. (Repealed by Statute Law Revision (Ireland) Act 1879 (42 & 43 Vict. c. 24))
Courts Martial Act 1799 (repealed)	39 Geo. 3. c. 11 (I)	25 March 1799
An Act for the suppression of the rebellion which still unhappily exists within this kingdom. (Repealed by Statute Law Revision (Ireland) Act 1879 (42 & 43 Vict. c. 24))
Hearth Duty Act 1799 (repealed)	39 Geo. 3. c. 12 (I)	25 March 1799
An Act for granting to his majesty for one year, the duties therein mentioned on fire hearths, in lieu of all duties payable on the same during the said term. (Repealed by Statute Law Revision (Ireland) Act 1879 (42 & 43 Vict. c. 24))
Trade with the United States Act 1799 (repealed)	39 Geo. 3. c. 13 (I)	25 March 1799
An Act for further continuing an act, entitled, "An Act for facilitating the trade and intercourse between this kingdom and the United States of America." (Note: Trade with United States Act 1788 (28 Geo. 3. c. 18 (I))) (Repealed by Statute Law Revision (Ireland) Act 1879 (42 & 43 Vict. c. 24))
Compensation for Tithes Act 1799 (repealed)	39 Geo. 3. c. 14 (I)	7 May 1799
An Act to enable all Ecclesiastical Persons and Bodies, Rectors, Vicars and Curates, and Impropriators, and those deriving by, from or under them, to recover a just Compensation for the Tithes withheld from them in the Years One thousand seven hundred and ninety seven and One thousand seven hundred and ninety eight, against such Persons as were liable to the same. (Repealed by Statute Law Revision (Ireland) Act 1879 (42 & 43 Vict. c. 24))
Window Tax Act 1799 (repealed)	39 Geo. 3. c. 15 (I)	7 May 1799
An Act for granting to his majesty certain rates and duties on dwelling houses inhabited, according to the number of windows or lights therein respectively. (Repealed by Statute Law Revision (Ireland) Act 1879 (42 & 43 Vict. c. 24))
Civil Bill Courts Act 1799 (repealed)	39 Geo. 3. c. 16 (I)	7 May 1799
An Act for the further Amendment of an Act passed in the Thirty-six Year of the Reign of His Majesty King George the Third, Entitled, "An Act for the better and more convenient Administration of Justice, and for the Recovery of small Debts in a summary Way at the Sessions of the Peace at the several Counties at large within this Kingdom, except the County of Dublin;" (Note: Peace Preservation Act 1787 (27 Geo. 3. c. 40 (I))) and for continuing and amending an Act, Entitled, "An Act for the better Execution of the Law, and Preservation of the Peace within Counties at large." (Note: Civil Bill Courts Act 1796 (36 Geo. 3. c. 25 (I))) (Repealed by Civil Bill Courts (Ireland) Act 1851 (14 & 15 Vict. c. 57))
Waterford Infirmary Act 1799^{(Republic of Ireland)}	39 Geo. 3. c. 17 (I)	7 May 1799
An Act for extending to the County of Waterford, the different Laws passed in this Kingdom for erecting, establishing and regulating of Public Infirmaries or Hospitals.
Indemnity (No. 2) Act (Ireland) 1799 (repealed)	39 Geo. 3. c. 18 (I)	7 May 1799
An Act for the relief of persons who have omitted to qualify themselves according to law. (Repealed by Statute Law Revision (Ireland) Act 1879 (42 & 43 Vict. c. 24))
Cathedrals used as Parish Churches Act 1799 (repealed)	39 Geo. 3. c. 19 (I)	1 June 1799
An Act for the Repairing of Cathedral Churches in Cases where the Parish Churches have been long in Ruins. (Repealed for the Republic of Ireland by Statute Law Revision (Pre-Union Irish Statutes) Act 1962 (No. 29) and for Northern Ireland by the Statute Law Revision Act 1950 (14 Geo. 6. c. 6))
Servants, Hearths, and Carriages Duties Act 1799 (repealed)	39 Geo. 3. c. 20 (I)	7 May 1799
An Act to continue an act made in the 38th year of his majesty's reign, entitled, "An Act to regulate the collection of duties on male servants, and to secure the payment thereof, and for the better collection of the duties on fire hearths, and on coaches and other carriages." (Note: Servants, Hearths, and Carriages Duties Act 1798 (38 Geo. 3. c. 45 (I))) (Repealed by Statute Law Revision (Ireland) Act 1879 (42 & 43 Vict. c. 24))
Coffee Act 1799 (repealed)	39 Geo. 3. c. 21 (I)	7 May 1799
An Act to continue an act passed in the 37th year of his majesty's reign, entitled, "An Act for regulating the import, export and sale of coffee, and securing the duties payable thereon." (Note: Coffee Act 1797 (37 Geo. 3. c. 52 (I))) (Repealed by Statute Law Revision (Ireland) Act 1879 (42 & 43 Vict. c. 24))
Tobacco Act 1799 (repealed)	39 Geo. 3. c. 22 (I)	7 May 1799
An Act to continue an act passed in the 37th year of his majesty's reign, entitled, "An Act for regulating and extending the tobacco trade, and for securing the duties payable on the import and manufacture of tobacco." (Note: Tobacco Act 1797 (37 Geo. 3. c. 42 (I))) (Repealed by Statute Law Revision (Ireland) Act 1879 (42 & 43 Vict. c. 24))
Beer and Spirits Act 1799 (repealed)	39 Geo. 3. c. 23 (I)	7 May 1799
An Act for granting additional duties on beer, ale and spirits imported into this kingdom. (Repealed by Statute Law Revision (Ireland) Act 1879 (42 & 43 Vict. c. 24))
Auctions, &c. Act 1799 (repealed)	39 Geo. 3. c. 24 (I)	7 May 1799
An Act to amend and continue an act passed last session of parliament (Note: Auctions, &c. Act 1798 (38 Geo. 3. c. 24 (I))) to secure the collection of the duties on auctions, and on glass bottles made in this kingdom, and on paper printed, painted or stained in this kingdom to serve for hangings or other uses. (Repealed by Statute Law Revision (Ireland) Act 1879 (42 & 43 Vict. c. 24))
English Loan Act 1799 (repealed)	39 Geo. 3. c. 25 (I)	7 May 1799
An Act to enable the commissioners of the treasury in Ireland to receive from the commissioners of the treasury in England a sum not exceeding the sum therein mentioned as a loan in part of the supply granted to his majesty for the service of the year 1799, and for securing the interest and charges thereon, and for raising by loan a further sum towards the said supply, and to exempt from certain duties such persons as have paid such voluntary contributions as therein mentioned. (Repealed by Statute Law Revision (Ireland) Act 1879 (42 & 43 Vict. c. 24))
Sites for Barracks Act 1799 (repealed)	39 Geo. 3. c. 26 (I)	7 May 1799
An Act to explain and amend the several acts now in being for the empowering the commissioners of barracks to provide barracks and other accommodations for his majesty's troops within this kingdom, and for the better enabling them to proceed in their marches. (Repealed by Statute Law Revision (Ireland) Act 1879 (42 & 43 Vict. c. 24))
Sugar Act 1799 (repealed)	39 Geo. 3. c. 27 (I)	7 May 1799
An Act for the reduction of drawbacks and bounties now allowed on the export of sugar. (Repealed by Statute Law Revision (Ireland) Act 1879 (42 & 43 Vict. c. 24))
Corporations Act 1799 (repealed)	39 Geo. 3. c. 28 (I)	7 May 1799
To extend the provisions of an act passed in the last session of parliament, entitled, "An Act for quieting corporations." (Note: Corporations Act 1798 (38 Geo. 3. c. 60 (I))) (Repealed by Statute Law Revision (Ireland) Act 1879 (42 & 43 Vict. c. 24))
Fisheries Act 1799 (repealed)	39 Geo. 3. c. 29 (I)	7 May 1799
An Act to continue an act passed in the 36th year of his majesty's reign, entitled, "An Act for continuing and amending the several acts for the further improvement and extension of the fisheries on the coasts of this kingdom." (Note: Sea Fisheries Act 1796 (36 Geo. 3. c. 52 (I))) (Repealed by Statute Law Revision (Ireland) Act 1879 (42 & 43 Vict. c. 24))
Militia Act (Ireland) 1799 (repealed)	39 Geo. 3. c. 30 (I)	7 May 1799
An Act to further explain and amend the laws now in force relating to the militia of this kingdom. (Repealed by Statute Law Revision (Ireland) Act 1879 (42 & 43 Vict. c. 24))
Militia (No. 2) Act (Ireland) 1799 (repealed)	39 Geo. 3. c. 31 (I)	7 May 1799
An Act for empowering his majesty for a time, and to an extent to be limited, to accept the service of such parts of his militia forces in this kingdom as may voluntarily offer themselves to be employed in Great Britain or elsewhere in Europe. (Repealed by Statute Law Revision (Ireland) Act 1879 (42 & 43 Vict. c. 24))
Sweets, Mead, and Vinegar Duties Act 1799 (repealed)	39 Geo. 3. c. 32 (I)	1 June 1799
An Act for granting unto his majesty the several duties therein mentioned on sweets or made wines, mead and vinegar, and for securing the collection thereof. (Repealed by Statute Law Revision (Ireland) Act 1879 (42 & 43 Vict. c. 24))
Quitrents and Crown Lands Act 1799	39 Geo. 3. c. 33 (I)	7 May 1799
An Act to amend an Act passed in the Thirty-eight Year of the Reign of His Majesty, Entitled, "An Act for the Sale of His Majesty's Quit Rents, Crown Rents, and other Rents, and of the Lands forfeited in the Years One thousand six hundred and forty-one, and One thousand six hundred and eighty-eight, and other Lands yet remaining undisposed of, in such Manner and under such Provisions as are therein mentioned." (Note: Quitrents and Crown Lands Act 1798 (38 Geo. 3. c. 72 (I)))
Malt Duties Act 1799 (repealed)	39 Geo. 3. c. 34 (I)	7 May 1799
An Act to amend and continue an act passed in the 37th year of his majesty's reign (Note: Malt Act 1797 (37 Geo. 3. c. 33 (I))) for collecting and securing his majesty's revenue upon malt. (Repealed by Statute Law Revision (Ireland) Act 1879 (42 & 43 Vict. c. 24))
Excise Duties and Licences Act 1799 (repealed)	39 Geo. 3. c. 35 (I)	7 May 1799
An Act for granting to his majesty the duties and additional duties on the licences therein mentioned. (Repealed by Statute Law Revision (Ireland) Act 1879 (42 & 43 Vict. c. 24))
Transportation Act 1799 (repealed)	39 Geo. 3. c. 36 (I)	7 May 1799
An Act to explain, amend, and extend the Provisions of an Act passed last Session of Parliament, Entitled, "An Act to prevent Persons from returning to His Majesty's Dominions, who have been or shall be transported, banished, or exiled on Account of the present Rebellion, and to prohibit them from passing into any Country at War with His Majesty." (Note: Transportation Act 1798 (38 Geo. 3. c. 78 (I))) (Repealed by Statute Law Revision (Ireland) Act 1879 (42 & 43 Vict. c. 24))
Gunpowder Act 1799 (repealed)	39 Geo. 3. c. 37 (I)	1 June 1799
An Act to regulate the manufacture and sale of gunpowder within this kingdom. (Repealed by Statute Law Revision (Ireland) Act 1879 (42 & 43 Vict. c. 24))
Expiring Laws Continuance (No. 2) Act 1799 (repealed)	39 Geo. 3. c. 38 (I)	1 June 1799
An Act to continue an act passed in the 38th year of his present majesty's reign, (Note: Dublin House of Industry Act 1797 (37 Geo. 3. c. 34 (I))) entitled, "An Act to continue for a limited time the government and management of the house of industry for the relief of the poor in Dublin," under the present acting governors thereof, and also, one other act passed in the same year, (Note: Dublin Workhouse, &c. Act 1798 (38 Geo. 3. c. 35 (I))) entitled, "An Act for the better management of the workhouse and foundling hospital in Dublin." (Repealed by Statute Law Revision (Ireland) Act 1879 (42 & 43 Vict. c. 24))
Hides, Skins, and Vellum Duties Act 1799 (repealed)	39 Geo. 3. c. 39 (I)	7 May 1799
An Act for the better collection of all duties on hides and skins tanned and dressed in oil, and on vellum and parchment made in Ireland, and for preventing of frauds on his majesty's revenue therein. (Repealed by Statute Law Revision (Ireland) Act 1879 (42 & 43 Vict. c. 24))
Spirit Licences Act 1799	39 Geo. 3. c. 40 (I)	7 May 1799
An Act for granting to his majesty the duties on licences to sell spirituous liquors and metheglin, and for continuing the several laws for regulating the issuing of licences for the sale of wine, ale, beer, cider and spirituous liquors by retail, and for preventing the immoderate use of spirituous liquors.
Distillers Act 1799	39 Geo. 3. c. 41 (I)	1 June 1799
An Act to amend and continue an act passed last session of parliament, (Note: Distillers Act 1798 (38 Geo. 3. c. 51 (I))) for regulating the trade of a distiller, and for securing the duties payable upon homemade spirits.
Paper Duty Act 1799 (repealed)	39 Geo. 3. c. 42 (I)	7 May 1799
An Act for granting to his majesty the duties therein mentioned on the several kinds of paper therein mentioned imported into and made in Ireland, and for amending and continuing an act passed last session of parliament (Note: Paper Duties Act 1798 (38 Geo. 3. c. 29 (I))) to secure the collection of the duties on paper made in Ireland, and to prevent frauds therein. (Repealed by Statute Law Revision (Ireland) Act 1879 (42 & 43 Vict. c. 24))
Duty on Goat Skins Act 1799 (repealed)	39 Geo. 3. c. 43 (I)	1 June 1799
An Act for granting to his majesty the duty therein mentioned on goat skins exported. (Repealed by Statute Law Revision (Ireland) Act 1879 (42 & 43 Vict. c. 24))
Stamp (No. 2) Act (Ireland) 1799 (repealed)	39 Geo. 3. c. 44 (I)	1 June 1799
An Act for the relief of persons who have omitted or may omit inadvertently to pay certain stamp duties therein mentioned, on deeds of other instruments. (Repealed by Statute Law Revision (Ireland) Act 1879 (42 & 43 Vict. c. 24))
Dublin Society Act 1799 (repealed)	39 Geo. 3. c. 45 (I)	1 June 1799
An Act for directing the application of the sum of £5,500 granted by parliament to the Dublin Society, for the improvement of husbandry and other useful arts. (Repealed by Statute Law Revision (Ireland) Act 1879 (42 & 43 Vict. c. 24))
Dublin and Ratoath Road Act 1799	39 Geo. 3. c. 46 (I)	1 June 1799
An Act for amending an Act passed in the Thirty-seventh year of the Reign of His present Majesty, (Note: Road from Dublin to Ratoath Act 1797 (37 Geo. 3. c. 29 (I))) Entitled, "An Act for improving and repairing the Roads leading from the City of Dublin to Ratoath and Carragha, and for altering and amending an Act passed in the Thirty-fifth Year of His present Majesty's Reign, (Note: Dublin and Ratoath Road Act 1795 (35 Geo. 3. c. 47 (I))) Entitled, 'An Act for making, widening, and repairing the Road leading from the City of Dublin to Ratoath, and for erecting Turnpikes thereon, in Aid of Barony Presentments.'"
Newcastle to Charleville Road Act 1799	39 Geo. 3. c. 47 (I)	1 June 1799
An Act for improving and repairing the Road leading from Newcastle, in the county of Limerick, to the City of Limerick, and from thence to Charleville, in the County of Cork, and for repealing the several Laws heretofore made relating to said Road.
Negotiation of Notes and Bills Act 1799	39 Geo. 3. c. 48 (I)	1 June 1799
An Act to restrain the Negociation of Promissory Notes and Inland Bills of Exchange, under a limited Sum.
Families of Militiamen Act 1799	39 Geo. 3. c. 49 (I)	1 June 1799
An Act to amend an Act passed in the Thirty-fifth Year of the Reign of His present Majesty, Entitled, "An Act for the more effectual Support of the Families of Militia Men." (Note: Families of Militiamen Act 1795 (35 Geo. 3. c. 2 (I)))
Indemnity and Insurrections Act 1799 (repealed)	39 Geo. 3. c. 50 (I)	1 June 1799
An Act to explain and amend an act, entitled, "An Act for indemnifying such persons as have acted since the 5th day of November 1797 for the preservation of the public peace, and suppression of insurrection prevailing in some parts of this kingdom," (Note: Indemnity (No. 2) Act (Ireland) 1798 (38 Geo. 3. c. 74 (I))) and to enable sheriffs and other officers to make the returns therein specified. (Repealed by Statute Law Revision (Ireland) Act 1879 (42 & 43 Vict. c. 24))
Inland Fisheries Act 1799 (repealed)	39 Geo. 3. c. 51 (I)	1 June 1799
An Act to revive and amend an Act, passed in the Twenty-sixth Year of His present Majesty's Reign, (Note: Inland Fisheries Act 1786 (26 Geo. 3. c. 50 (I))) Entitled, "An Act to explain and amend an Act passed in the Twenty-third and Twenty-fourth Year of His present Majesty, (Note: Inland Fisheries Act 1783 (23 & 24 Geo. 3. c. 40 (I))) Entitled, 'An Act for the Protection and Improvement of the Inland Fisheries of this Kingdom.'" (Repealed by Fisheries (Ireland) Act 1842 (5 & 6 Vict. c. 106))
Road in Cork Act 1799	39 Geo. 3. c. 52 (I)	1 June 1799
An Act to explain and amend an Act passed in the Thirty-eighth Year of the Reign of his present Majesty, Entitled, "An Act for improving and repairing the turnpike Road leading from the City of Cork to the Brook which bounds the Counties of Cork and Tipperary near the Foot of Kilworth Mountain, and for repealing the several Laws heretofore made relating to the said Road." (Note: Road from Dublin to Kilcullen Act 1798 (38 Geo. 3. c. 83 (I)))
City of Dublin Act 1799	39 Geo. 3. c. 53 (I)	1 June 1799
An Act to grant certain Duties therein mentioned to His Majesty, to be applied to the Purpose of making wide and convenient Ways, Streets, and Passages in the City of Dublin, for enabling the Commissioners therein mentioned more effectually to execute the Trusts reposed in them.
Sugar (No. 2) Act 1799 (repealed)	39 Geo. 3. c. 54 (I)	1 June 1799
An Act for regulating the allowance of the drawback and payment of the bounty on the exportation of sugar. (Repealed by Statute Law Revision (Ireland) Act 1879 (42 & 43 Vict. c. 24))
Gaols Act 1799	39 Geo. 3. c. 55 (I)	1 June 1799
An Act to promote the Building of New Gaols. (Repealed for the Republic of Ireland by Statute Law Revision (Pre-Union Irish Statutes) Act 1962 (No. 29))
Dublin Police, &c. Act 1799 (repealed)	39 Geo. 3. c. 56 (I)	1 June 1799
An Act to amend an Act, passed in the Thirty-fifth Year of the Reign of His present Majesty, Entitled, "An Act for more effectually preserving the Peace within the City of Dublin, and the District of the Metropolis, and establishing a Parochial Watch in the said City;" (Note: Dublin Police Act 1795 (35 Geo. 3. c. 36 (I))) and also to amend one other Act passed in the Thirty-sixth Year of His present Majesty, (Note: Dublin Police Act 1796 (36 Geo. 3. c. 30 (I))) Entitled, "An Act to explain and amend an Act passed in the thirty-fifth Year of the Reign of His present Majesty, Entitled, 'An Act for more effectually preserving the Peace within the City of Dublin, and the District of the Metropolis, and establishing a Parochial Watch in the said City, and for remedying the Abuses committed by Pawnbrokers within the District of the Metropolis, or three Miles thereof.'" (Repealed by Statute Law Revision (Ireland) Act 1879 (42 & 43 Vict. c. 24))
Bankrupts Act 1799	39 Geo. 3. c. 57 (I)	1 June 1799
An Act for the relief of uncertificated bankrupts.
Rectifying of Spirits Act 1799 (repealed)	39 Geo. 3. c. 58 (I)	1 June 1799
An Act to continue and amend an Act, passed in the Thirty-eighth Year of His Majesty's Reign, Entitled, "An Act to regulate the Trade of rectifying Spirits, and to prevent Frauds on His Majesty's Revenue by Rectifiers of Spirits." (Note: Rectifying of Spirits Act 1798 (38 Geo. 3. c. 52 (I))) (Repealed by Statute Law Revision (Ireland) Act 1879 (42 & 43 Vict. c. 24))
Forces (Tolls) Act 1799	39 Geo. 3. c. 59 (I)	1 June 1799
An Act to enable His Majesty's Forces, under Orders of March, to pass through Turnpikes and over Bridges, Toll free. (Repealed for the Republic of Ireland by Statute Law Revision (Pre-Union Irish Statutes) Act 1962 (No. 29))
Stock Exchange (Dublin) Act 1799^{(Republic of Ireland)} (repealed)	39 Geo. 3. c. 60 (I)	1 June 1799
An Act for the better regulation of Stock Brokers. (Repealed by Stock Exchange Act 1995 (No. 9))
Hides, Skins, and Bark Regulation Act 1799 (repealed)	39 Geo. 3. c. 61 (I)	1 June 1799
An Act to revive and continue the several Laws relating to the curing of Hides, and regulating the Sale of Hides and Calf Skins, and preventing Frauds in the selling thereof, and for preventing Frauds in the weighing and Delivery of Bark imported into this Kingdom. (Repealed by Statute Law Revision (Ireland) Act 1879 (42 & 43 Vict. c. 24))
Game Licences Act 1799 (repealed)	39 Geo. 3. c. 62 (I)	1 June 1799
An Act for granting to his majesty certain duties on certificates to be issued with respect to the killing of game. (Repealed by Statute Law Revision (Ireland) Act 1879 (42 & 43 Vict. c. 24))
Bank of England Act 1799^{(Republic of Ireland)} or the Bank of England Act (Ireland) 1799	39 Geo. 3. c. 63 (I)	1 June 1799
An Act for the more effectual preventing the forging of Bills of Exchange and Promissory Notes, or any acceptance, Assignment, or Indorsement thereof, or any Acquittance or Receipt for Money or Goods; and also for preventing the forging of the Promissory Notes of the Governor and Company of the Bank of England, commonly called Bank Notes, and the Bills of Exchange of the said Governor and Company, called Bank Post Bills. (Repealed for Northern Ireland by Statute Law (Repeals) Act 1973 (c. 39))
Treasury Bills, &c. Act 1799 (repealed)	39 Geo. 3. c. 64 (I)	1 June 1799
An Act for raising the several sums therein mentioned, for the purposes therein mentioned, and for authorising the issue of so much thereof as hath been granted to defray the expense of the regular and militia forces on the establishment of Great Britain employed in this kingdom, and for defraying the expense of defeating any enterprise or design of the common enemy. (Repealed by Statute Law Revision (Ireland) Act 1879 (42 & 43 Vict. c. 24))
Rebellion Losses Commission Act 1799 (repealed)	39 Geo. 3. c. 65 (I)	1 June 1799
An Act for the more effectually carrying into execution the purposes of an act passed last session of parliament, (Note: Rebellion Losses Commission Act 1798 (38 Geo. 3. c. 68 (I))) for appointing commissioners to enquire into losses of such of his majesty's loyal subjects as have been sufferers in their property during the subsisting rebellion in this kingdom, and for providing a fund for rewarding in manner therein, persons who have rendered service by discovery of traitors. (Repealed by Statute Law Revision (Ireland) Act 1879 (42 & 43 Vict. c. 24))
Revenue Act 1799	39 Geo. 3. c. 66 (I)	1 June 1799
An Act for continuing and amending several laws relating to his majesty's revenue, and for the more effectually preventing the frauds therein.
Recognizances Act 1799	39 Geo. 3. c. 67 (I)	1 June 1799
An Act to amend an act passed in the 38th year of his majesty's reign, entitled, "An Act for the better collection of sums arising from forfeited recognizances, and from fines imposed at assizes, commissions of oyer and terminer and general gaol delivery, and sessions of the peace, and for the future application of the same." (Note: Fines and Recognizances Act 1798 (38 Geo. 3. c. 50 (I)))

=== Private acts ===
Short title, or popular name	Citation	Royal assent
Long title
Viscount Mountjoy's Estate Act 1799	39 Geo. 3. c. 1 Pr. (I)	1 June 1799
An Act to enable the guardians of the Right Honourable Charles John, Lord Viscount Mountjoy, a minor, to make leases of certain parts of said minors estates in and near the city of Dublin.

=== Sources ===
- "The thirty-ninth Year of George III". Statutes Passed in the Parliaments Held in Ireland. Vol. XXI: From the Thirty-nineth Year of George III. A.D. 1799, to the Fortieth Year of George III. A.D. 1800, inclusive. Dublin: George Grierson. 1801. pp. 1–114 – via Google Books.
- "Acts of Parliament by Session: 1799". Irish Legislation Database. Queen's University Belfast.
- "Pre-Union Irish Statutes: 1799 Acts". Irish Statute Book. Attorney General of Ireland.

== 40 Geo. 3. (1800) ==
The 3rd session of the 6th parliament of George III, which met from 15 January 1800 to 2 August 1800. This was the final session of the Parliament of Ireland, which was replaced from 1801 by the new Parliament of the United Kingdom.

This session was also traditionally cited as 40 G. 3.

=== Public acts ===
Short title, or popular name	Citation	Royal assent
Long title
Militia Act (Ireland) 1800 (repealed)	40 Geo. 3. c. 1 (I)	24 March 1800
An Act for enabling his Majesty to accept the Services of Volunteers from the Militia under certain Restrictions, and for amending the Law relative to the Militia of Ireland. (Repealed by Statute Law Revision (Ireland) Act 1879 (42 & 43 Vict. c. 24))
Courts Martial Act 1800 (repealed)	40 Geo. 3. c. 2 (I)	24 March 1800
An Act to revive with Amendments an Act passed last Session of Parliament, Entitled, "An Act for the Suppression of the Rebellion which still unhappily exists within this Kingdom and for the Protection of the Persons and Properties of his Majesty's faithful Subjects within the same." (Note: Courts Martial Act 1799 (39 Geo. 3. c. 11 (I))) (Repealed by Statute Law Revision (Ireland) Act 1879 (42 & 43 Vict. c. 24))
Loan and Consolidated Fund Act 1800 (repealed)	40 Geo. 3. c. 3 (I)	24 March 1800
An Act for securing the Payment of the Annuities, and of the Interest and Charges upon the principal Sums therein provided for, and towards Discharge of such principal Sums in such Manner as therein is directed, and for enabling the Officers of his Majesty's Treasury to receive certain Sums for a limited Time, in Manner therein mentioned, and for granting unto his Majesty a certain Sum of Money out of the Consolidated Fund, and for applying a certain Sum of Money therein mentioned, for the Service of the Year one thousand eight hundred, and for other Purposes. (Repealed by Statute Law Revision (Ireland) Act 1879 (42 & 43 Vict. c. 24))
Duties and Trade Regulation Act 1800 (repealed)	40 Geo. 3. c. 4 (I)	24 March 1800
An Act for granting for one Year the several Duties therein mentioned, in Lieu of all other Duties payable upon the Articles there in specified during the said Term, and for regulating the Trade between this Kingdom and his Majesty's Colonies, and for other Purposes therein mentioned. (Repealed by Statute Law Revision (Ireland) Act 1879 (42 & 43 Vict. c. 24))
Qualification Indemnity Act 1800 (repealed)	40 Geo. 3. c. 5 (I)	24 March 1800
An Act for the Relief of Persons who have omitted to qualify themselves according to Law. (Repealed by Statute Law Revision (Ireland) Act 1879 (42 & 43 Vict. c. 24))
Malt and Spirits Prohibition Act 1800 (repealed)	40 Geo. 3. c. 6 (I)	24 March 1800
An Act to prohibit the making of Malt, and distilling of Spirits in this Kingdom, for a limited Time. (Repealed by Statute Law Revision (Ireland) Act 1879 (42 & 43 Vict. c. 24))
Mutiny Act (Ireland) 1800 (repealed)	40 Geo. 3. c. 7 (I)	24 March 1800
An Act for punishing Mutiny and Desertion, and for the better Payment of the Army and their Quarters within this Kingdom. (Repealed by Statute Law Revision (Ireland) Act 1879 (42 & 43 Vict. c. 24))
Postage Act 1800 (repealed)	40 Geo. 3. c. 8 (I)	24 March 1800
An Act for granting to his Majesty, his Heirs and Successors, certain Duties and Rates upon the Portage and Conveyance of all Letters and Packets within this Kingdom. (Repealed by Statute Law Revision (Ireland) Act 1879 (42 & 43 Vict. c. 24))
Hides, Skins, and Vellum Duties Act 1800	40 Geo. 3. c. 9 (I)	24 March 1800
An Act for the better Collection of all Duties on Hides and Skins tanned and dressed in Oil, and on Vellum and Parchment made in Ireland, and for preventing Frauds on his Majesty's Revenue therein.
Stamp Duties Act 1800 (repealed)	40 Geo. 3. c. 10 (I)	24 March 1800
An Act for granting to his Majesty, his Heirs and Successors, several Duties therein mentioned, to be levied by the Commissioners for managing the Stamp Duties. (Repealed by Statute Law Revision (Ireland) Act 1879 (42 & 43 Vict. c. 24))
Sea Fisheries Act 1800 (repealed)	40 Geo. 3. c. 11 (I)	10 April 1800
An Act to continue an Act, passed in the thirty-sixth Year of his Majesty's Reign, Entitled, "An Act for continuing and amending the several Acts for the further Improvement and Extension of the Fisheries on the Coasts of this Kingdom." (Note: Sea Fisheries Act 1796 (36 Geo. 3. c. 52 (I))) (Repealed by Statute Law Revision (Ireland) Act 1879 (42 & 43 Vict. c. 24))
Militia Pay and Clothing Act 1800 (repealed)	40 Geo. 3. c. 12 (I)	10 April 1800
An Act for defraying the Charge of the Pay and Clothing of the Militia for one Year, from the twenty-fifth Day of March, one thousand eight hundred. (Repealed by Statute Law Revision (Ireland) Act 1879 (42 & 43 Vict. c. 24))
American Trade Act 1800 (repealed)	40 Geo. 3. c. 13 (I)	10 April 1800
An Act for further continuing an Act, Entitled, "An Act for facilitating the Trade and Intercourse between this Kingdom and the United States of America." (Note: Trade with United States Act 1788 (28 Geo. 3. c. 18 (I))) (Repealed by Statute Law Revision (Ireland) Act 1879 (42 & 43 Vict. c. 24))
Wines, Rum, and Export Duties Act 1800 (repealed)	40 Geo. 3. c. 14 (I)	10 April 1800
An Act for ascertaining the Stock of Foreign Wines belonging to Dealers in and Sellers of such Wines on the twenty-fifth of March, One thousand eight hundred, and for securing certain Duties of Excise thereon, and for granting to his Majesty a further Duty on Rum imported, and certain Duties on the Exportation of certain Goods to the British Plantations in America and the West Indies, in Lieu of all other Duties. (Repealed by Statute Law Revision (Ireland) Act 1879 (42 & 43 Vict. c. 24))
Aliens and Arms Importation Act 1800 (repealed)	40 Geo. 3. c. 15 (I)	10 April 1800
An Act for continuing an Act, passed in the thirty-third Year of his Majesty's Reign, Entitled, "An Act for establishing Regulations respecting Aliens arriving in this Kingdom, or resident therein, in certain Cases, and Subjects of this Kingdom, who have served, or are serving in Foreign Armies," (Note: Alien Act 1793 (33 Geo. 3. c. 1 (I))) and for continuing an other Act passed in the thirty-sixth Year of his present Majesty's Reign, Entitled, "An Act to prevent the Importation of Arms, Gunpowder, and Ammunition into this Kingdom, and making and removing, selling and keeping of Gunpowder, Arms, and Ammunition, without License." (Note: Arms Act 1796 (36 Geo. 3. c. 42 (I))) (Repealed by Statute Law Revision (Ireland) Act 1879 (42 & 43 Vict. c. 24))
Stamp Duties (No. 2) Act 1800 (repealed)	40 Geo. 3. c. 16 (I)	10 April 1800
An Act for granting to his Majesty, his Heirs and Successors, several Duties therein mentioned, to be levied by the Commissioners for managing the Stamp Duties. (Repealed by Statute Law Revision (Ireland) Act 1879 (42 & 43 Vict. c. 24))
Silk Manufacture Act 1800 (repealed)	40 Geo. 3. c. 17 (I)	10 April 1800
An Act to continue an Act passed in the thirty-sixth year of his present Majesty's Reign, (Note: Silk Manufacture Act 1796 (36 Geo. 3. c. 37 (I))) Entitled, "An Act to explain and amend an Act passed in the Nineteenth and Twentieth years of his Majesty's reign, (Note: Silk Manufacture Act 1779 (19 & 20 Geo. 3. c. 24 (I))) Entitled, 'An Act for the better Regulation of the Silk Manufacture.'" (Repealed by Statute Law Revision (Ireland) Act 1879 (42 & 43 Vict. c. 24))
Habeas Corpus Suspension Act 1800 (repealed)	40 Geo. 3. c. 18 (I)	10 April 1800
An Act to empower the Lord Lieutenant, or other Chief Governor or Governors of Ireland, to apprehend and detain such Persons as he or they shall suspect for conspiring against his Majesty's Person and Government. (Repealed by Statute Law Revision (Ireland) Act 1879 (42 & 43 Vict. c. 24))
Justices of Assize Act 1800 (repealed)	40 Geo. 3. c. 19 (I)	10 April 1800
An Act to enact that part of an Act passed in the Parliament of England in the Eighth Year of Richard the Second, (Note: Justices of Assize, etc. Act 1384 (8 Ric. 2. c. 2. (Eng.))) shall not continue to be of Force in this Kingdom, any law to the contrary notwithstanding. (Repealed by Statute Law Revision (Ireland) Act 1879 (42 & 43 Vict. c. 24))
Export Bounties Act 1800 (repealed)	40 Geo. 3. c. 20 (I)	10 April 1800
An Act for regulating the Payment of Bounties on the Exportation of certain Manufactures of this Kingdom. (Repealed by Customs Law Repeal Act 1825 (6 Geo. 4. c. 105))
Uncertified Bankrupts Act 1800	40 Geo. 3. c. 21 (I)	10 April 1800
An Act for the Relief of uncertified Bankrupts.
Bankers' Act 1800	40 Geo. 3. c. 22 (I)	12 June 1800
An Act for the Relief of Bankers who have stopped, or who shall stop Payment, and who have or shall conform to the Directions of the Act of Parliament of the thirty-third of George the Second, (Note: Bankers' Act 1759 (33 Geo. 2. c. 14 (I))) called the Bankers' Act. (Repealed for the Republic of Ireland by Statute Law Revision (Pre-Union Irish Statutes) Act 1962 (No. 29))
Tithe Agistment Act 1800 (repealed)	40 Geo. 3. c. 23 (I)	12 June 1800
An Act to quiet and bar all Claims of Tythe Agistment for dry and barren Cattle. (Repealed by Statute Law Revision (Ireland) Act 1879 (42 & 43 Vict. c. 24))
Burning of Land Act 1800 (repealed)	40 Geo. 3. c. 24 (I)	12 June 1800
An Act for more effectually preventing the burning of Land. (Repealed by Landlord and Tenant Law Amendment (Ireland) Act 1860 (23 & 24 Vict. c. 154) and for the Republic of Ireland by Statute Law Revision (Pre-Union Irish Statutes) Act 1962 (No. 29))
Imported Refined Sugars Duty Act 1800 (repealed)	40 Geo. 3. c. 25 (I)	12 June 1800
An Act for granting an additional Duty on refined Sugars imported into this Kingdom. (Repealed by Statute Law Revision (Ireland) Act 1879 (42 & 43 Vict. c. 24))
Newry Barracks Act 1800	40 Geo. 3. c. 26 (I)	1 August 1800
An Act to enable the Barrack-Master-General to carry into Execution an Agreement lately made with the Trustees of the Ulster White Linen Hall, near Newry, for the Sale of their Interest therein, and for vesting the same in his Majesty, his Heirs and Successors.
Curates Maintenance Act 1800	40 Geo. 3. c. 27 (I)	1 August 1800
An Act for the further Support and Maintenance of Curates within the Church of Ireland.
Malt and Spirits Prohibition (Amendment) Act 1800 (repealed)	40 Geo. 3. c. 28 (I)	1 August 1800
An Act for amending an Act passed this Session of Parliament, Entitled, "An Act to prohibit the making of Malt and distilling of Spirits in this Kingdom." (Note: Malt and Spirits Prohibition Act 1800 (40 Geo. 3. c. 6 (I))) (Repealed by Statute Law Revision (Ireland) Act 1879 (42 & 43 Vict. c. 24))
Act of Union (Election of Representatives) Act 1800	40 Geo. 3. c. 29 (I)	1 August 1800
An Act to regulate the Mode by which the Lords Spiritual and Temporal, and the Commons to serve in the Parliament of the United Kingdom on the Part of Ireland, shall be summoned and returned to the said Parliament. (Repealed for the Republic of Ireland by Statute Law Revision (Pre-Union Irish Statutes) Act 1962 (No. 29))
Forfeited Recognizances Act 1800	40 Geo. 3. c. 30 (I)	1 August 1800
An Act further to continue an Act, passed in the thirty-eighth year of the Reign of his present Majesty, Entitled, "An Act for the better Collection of Sums arising from forfeited Recognizances, and from Fines imposed at Assizes, Commissions of Oyer and Terminer, and General Gaol Delivery, and Sessions of the Peace, and for the future Application of the same," (Note: Fines and Recognizances Act 1798 (38 Geo. 3. c. 50 (I))) and also to repeal and amend Part of an Act passed in the thirty-ninth Year of the Reign of his present Majesty, (Note: Recognizances Act 1799 (39 Geo. 3. c. 67 (I))) Entitled, "An Act to amend an Act, passed in the Thirty-eighth Year of his Majesty's Reign, Entitled, 'An Act for the better Collection of Sums arising from forfeited Recognizances, and from Fines imposed at Assizes, Commissions of Oyer and Terminer, and General Gaol Delivery, and Sessions of the Peace, and for the future Application of the same.'"
Dublin Society Act 1800 (repealed)	40 Geo. 3. c. 31 (I)	1 August 1800
An Act for directing the Application of the Sum of Five Thousand Five Hundred Pounds, granted by Parliament to the Dublin Society for the Improvement of Husbandry and other useful Arts in Ireland; and for granting to the said Society the further Sum of Ten Thousand Pounds for the Purposes therein mentioned. (Repealed by Statute Law Revision (Ireland) Act 1879 (42 & 43 Vict. c. 24))
Clare Infirmary Act 1800	40 Geo. 3. c. 32 (I)	1 August 1800
An Act for the better governing and managing the Infirmary of the County of Clare.
Rotunda Hospital Act 1800	40 Geo. 3. c. 33 (I)	1 August 1800
An Act for the better Management, Support, and Maintenance of the Foundling Hospital in Dublin, and for amending and further continuing an Act passed in the Thirty-eighth Year of his present Majesty's Reign, Entitled, "An Act for the better Management of the Workhouse and Foundling Hospital in Dublin." (Note: Dublin Workhouse, &c. Act 1798 (38 Geo. 3. c. 35 (I)))
Borough Compensation Act 1800 (repealed)	40 Geo. 3. c. 34 (I)	1 August 1800
An Act for granting Allowances to Bodies Corporate and Individuals, in Respect to those Cities, Towns, and Boroughs, which shall cease to send any Member to Parliament after the Union, and to make Compensation to those Persons whose Offices may thereby be discontinued or diminished in Value. (Repealed by Statute Law Revision (Ireland) Act 1879 (42 & 43 Vict. c. 24))
Charleton's Estate Act 1800	40 Geo. 3. c. 35 (I)	1 August 1800
An Act for vesting in Trustees the real Estates, situate in the Counties of Meath and Longford, which belonged to Thomas Charleton, late of Curratown, in the County of Meath, Esq. deceased, and for making them a Corporation for the Purpose of carrying into Effect the charitable Purposes and Intentions of the Will of the said Thomas Charleton, and for other Purposes.
Woollen Cloth (Old Drapery) Act 1800	40 Geo. 3. c. 36 (I)	1 August 1800
An Act for amending and rendering more effectual several Acts heretofore passed in this Kingdom, for the true making of Woollen Cloth, called and known by the Name of Old Drapery.
Belfast Improvement Act 1800 or the Belfast Police Act 1800	40 Geo. 3. c. 37 (I)	1 August 1800
An Act for paving, cleansing, and lighting, and improving the several Streets, Squares, Lanes, and Passages within the Town of Belfast, in the County of Antrim, and for removing and preventing all Encroachments, Obstructions, and Annoyances therein; and also for establishing and maintaining a nightly Watch throughout the said Town and Precincts thereof, and for other Purposes.
Act of Union (Ireland) 1800	40 Geo. 3. c. 38 (I)	1 August 1800
An Act for the Union of Great Britain and Ireland. (Repealed for the Republic of Ireland by Statute Law Revision (Pre-Union Irish Statutes) Act 1962 (No. 29))
Court of Exchequer Chamber Act 1800 (repealed)	40 Geo. 3. c. 39 (I)	1 August 1800
An Act for the more speedy Correction of Erroneous Judgments given in the Courts of Law in this Kingdom. (Repealed by Statute Law Revision (Ireland) Act 1879 (42 & 43 Vict. c. 24))
Dublin House of Industry Act 1800	40 Geo. 3. c. 40 (I)	1 August 1800
An Act for the better Regulation and Management of the House of Industry, established for the Relief of the Poor in Dublin.
Londonderry Bridge Act 1800	40 Geo. 3. c. 41 (I)	1 August 1800
An Act for amending an Act, passed in the thirtieth Year of his Majesty's Reign, Entitled, "An Act for building a Bridge over the River Lough Foyle, in the City of Londonderry, and the Suburbs thereof, and for certain Regulations relative to said City. (Note: Londonderry Bridge Act 1790 (30 Geo. 3. c. 31 (I)))
Insolvent Debtors Act 1800 (repealed)	40 Geo. 3. c. 42 (I)	1 August 1800
An Act for the Relief of confined Debtors who may be insolvent. (Repealed by Statute Law Revision (Ireland) Act 1879 (42 & 43 Vict. c. 24))
Revenue Act 1800 (repealed)	40 Geo. 3. c. 43 (I)	1 August 1800
An Act for better regulating the Collection of his Majesty's Revenue, and for preventing of Frauds therein, and for repealing an Act made in the thirty-ninth Year of the Reign of his present Majesty, Entitled, "An Act for continuing and amending several Laws relating to his Majesty's Revenue, and for the more effectually preventing the Frauds therein," (Note: Revenue Act 1799 (39 Geo. 3. c. 66 (I))) and the several Acts and Statutes which are mentioned to be continued by this Act. (Repealed by Statute Law Revision (Ireland) Act 1879 (42 & 43 Vict. c. 24))
Transportation Act 1800 (repealed)	40 Geo. 3. c. 44 (I)	1 August 1800
An Act to prevent Persons from returning to his Majesty's Dominions who have been or shall be transported, banished, or exiled on Account of Rebellion. (Repealed by Statute Law Revision (Ireland) Act 1879 (42 & 43 Vict. c. 24))
Foreign Wines and Spirits Duties Act 1800 (repealed)	40 Geo. 3. c. 45 (I)	1 August 1800
An Act for granting to his Majesty Excise Duties on Foreign Wines in his Majesty's Stores, or in the Stores or Warehouses of Dealers in, or Retailers of Wine, at the Time therein mentioned, and for granting further Duties on Spirits distilled, and on Sweets or made Wines made in Ireland. (Repealed by Statute Law Revision (Ireland) Act 1879 (42 & 43 Vict. c. 24))
First Fruits Act 1800 (repealed)	40 Geo. 3. c. 46 (I)	1 August 1800
An Act for amending an Act, Entitled, "An Act for confirming the several Grants made by her late Majesty of the First Fruits and Twentieth Parts, payable out of the Ecclesiastical Benefices in this Kingdom," (Note: First Fruits Act 1715 (2 Geo. 1. c. 15 (I))) and also for giving the Archbishops and other Ecclesiastical Persons Four Years Time for the Payment of First Fruits, and for incorporating the Trustees and Commissioners of the said First Fruits. (Repealed by Statute Law Revision (Ireland) Act 1879 (42 & 43 Vict. c. 24))
City of Dublin (Improvement) Act 1800^{(Republic of Ireland)} or the City of Dublin Act 1800	40 Geo. 3. c. 47 (I)	1 August 1800
An Act for amending and rendering more effectual two several Acts, one passed in the Twenty-sixth Year of his present Majesty's Reign, Entitled, "An Act for promoting the Trade of Dublin, by rendering its Port and Harbour more commodious," (Note: Dublin Port Act 1786 (26 Geo. 3. c. 19 (I))) and the other Act passed in the Thirty-second Year of his Majesty's Reign, (Note: City of Dublin Act 1792 (32 Geo. 3. c. 35 (I))) Entitled, "An Act for repairing and preserving the Walls of the River Anna Liffey in the City of Dublin, and for amending an Act passed in the Twenty-sixth Year of his Majesty's Reign, Entitled, 'An Act for promoting the Trade of Dublin by rendering its Port and Harbour more commodious.'"
Road from Dublin to Knocksedan Act 1800	40 Geo. 3. c. 48 (I)	1 August 1800
An Act to amend an Act passed in the Thirty-eighth Year of the Reign of his present Majesty, Entitled, "An Act for amending the Road from Dublin to Knocksedan, in the County of Dublin." (Note: Roads in Dublin County Act 1798 (38 Geo. 3. c. 31 (I)))
Rebellion Losses and Indemnity Act 1800 (repealed)	40 Geo. 3. c. 49 (I)	1 August 1800
An Act to amend and continue two several Acts passed in the Thirty-eighth (Note: Rebellion Losses Commission Act 1798 (38 Geo. 3. c. 68 (I))) and Thirty-ninth (Note: Rebellion Losses Commission Act 1799 (39 Geo. 3. c. 65 (I))) Years of the Reign of his present Majesty, for appointing Commissioners to enquire into the Losses of such of his Majesty's loyal Subjects as have suffered in their Property during the late Rebellion, and the other Purposes in the said Acts mentioned, and for authorising the Payment of Sums therein mentioned to Persons who have suffered in their Persons, and to the Widows and Orphans of others who lost their Lives in said Rebellion, and to Persons who exerted themselves in discovering the late Rebellion, and been exposed to Danger, or sustained Injury in Consequence thereof. (Repealed by Statute Law Revision (Ireland) Act 1879 (42 & 43 Vict. c. 24))
Parliamentary Officers Annuities Act 1800 (repealed)	40 Geo. 3. c. 50 (I)	1 August 1800
An Act for granting certain Annuities to the Officers and Attendants of both Houses of Parliament, whose Offices and Attendance shall cease after the Union, or whose Offices shall be diminished in Value thereby. (Repealed by Statute Law Revision (Ireland) Act 1879 (42 & 43 Vict. c. 24))
Inland Navigation Act 1800^{(Republic of Ireland)}	40 Geo. 3. c. 51 (I)	1 August 1800
An Act for granting to His Majesty the Sum of Five Hundred Thousand Pounds for promoting Inland Navigation in Ireland, and for the other Purposes therein mentioned, and for the authorizing of the said Sum by Loan.
Hearth, Coach, and Window Taxes Act 1800 (repealed)	40 Geo. 3. c. 52 (I)	1 August 1800
An Act to regulate the Collection of the Rates and Taxes in Ireland in Respect of Fire Hearths, Coaches and other Carriages, and of Male Servants, and on Dwelling-houses inhabited, according to the Number of Windows or Lights therein respectively, and to secure the due Payment thereof. (Repealed by Statute Law Revision (Ireland) Act 1879 (42 & 43 Vict. c. 24))
Annuities (Monck Mason, &c.) Act 1800 (repealed)	40 Geo. 3. c. 53 (I)	1 August 1800
An Act to enable his Majesty to grant certain Annuities to the Right Honourable John Monck Mason, and to the Earls of Athlone and Roscommon, and to the Lord Baron Aylmer, in Manner therein mentioned. (Repealed by Statute Law Revision (Ireland) Act 1879 (42 & 43 Vict. c. 24))
Spirituous Liquors Licences Act 1800 (repealed)	40 Geo. 3. c. 54 (I)	1 August 1800
An Act for continuing and amending the several Laws for regulating the issuing of Licenses for the Sale of Wine, Ale, Beer, Cider, and spirituous Liquors by Retail, and for preventing the immoderate Use of spirituous Liquors. (Repealed by Statute Law Revision (Ireland) Act 1879 (42 & 43 Vict. c. 24))
Sugar Distillation Act 1800 (repealed)	40 Geo. 3. c. 55 (I)	1 August 1800
An Act to encourage the Distillation of Spirits from Sugar for a limited Time. (Repealed by Statute Law Revision (Ireland) Act 1879 (42 & 43 Vict. c. 24))
Rectifying of Spirits Act 1800 (repealed)	40 Geo. 3. c. 56 (I)	1 August 1800
An Act to continue an Act passed in the Thirty-eighth Year of his Majesty's Reign, Entitled, "An Act to regulate the Trade of rectifying Spirits, and to prevent Frauds on his Majesty's Revenue by Rectifiers of Spirits;" (Note: Rectifying of Spirits Act 1798 (38 Geo. 3. c. 52 (I))) and one other Act passed in the Thirty-ninth Year of his Majesty's Reign, (Note: Rectifying of Spirits Act 1799 (39 Geo. 3. c. 58 (I))) Entitled, "An Act to continue and amend an Act passed in the Thirty-eighth Year of his Majesty's Reign, Entitled, An Act to regulate the Trade of rectifying Spirits, and to prevent Frauds on his Majesty's Revenue by Rectifiers of Spirits.'" (Repealed by Statute Law Revision (Ireland) Act 1879 (42 & 43 Vict. c. 24))
Malt Act 1800 (repealed)	40 Geo. 3. c. 57 (I)	1 August 1800
An Act to amend and continue an Act passed in the Thirty-seventh Year of his Majesty's Reign, (Note: Malt Act 1797 (37 Geo. 3. c. 33 (I))) for collecting and securing his Majesty's Revenue upon Malt. (Repealed by Statute Law Revision (Ireland) Act 1879 (42 & 43 Vict. c. 24))
Malt and Spirits Prohibition (Amendment) (No. 2) Act 1800 (repealed)	40 Geo. 3. c. 58 (I)	1 August 1800
An Act to amend Two Acts passed in this Session of Parliament, one Entitled, "An Act to prohibit the making of Malt and distilling of Spirits in this Kingdom, for a limited Time," and the other (Note: Malt and Spirits Prohibition (Amendment) Act 1800 (40 Geo. 3. c. 28 (I))) for amending the said Act. (Repealed by Statute Law Revision (Ireland) Act 1879 (42 & 43 Vict. c. 24))
Game Licences Act 1800 (repealed)	40 Geo. 3. c. 59 (I)	1 August 1800
An Act to amend and explain an Act passed in the Fortieth Year of the Reign of his present Majesty, Entitled, "An Act for granting to his Majesty, his Heirs and Successors, several Duties therein mentioned, to be levied by the Commissioners for managing the Stamp Duties. (Repealed by Statute Law Revision (Ireland) Act 1879 (42 & 43 Vict. c. 24))
Treasury Bills, &c. Act 1800 (repealed)	40 Geo. 3. c. 60 (I)	1 August 1800
An Act for granting to his Majesty a further Supply out of the Consolidated Fund, to be applied to the Purposes therein mentioned, and for raising by Loan the several Sums therein mentioned. (Repealed by Statute Law Revision (Ireland) Act 1879 (42 & 43 Vict. c. 24))
Dublin Wide Streets Act 1800	40 Geo. 3. c. 61 (I)	1 August 1800
An Act to amend and explain an Act passed in the Thirty-ninth Year of the Reign of his present Majesty, Entitled, "An Act to grant certain Duties therein mentioned to his Majesty, to be applied to the Purpose of making wide and convenient Ways, Streets and Passages in the City of Dublin," (Note: City of Dublin Act 1799 (39 Geo. 3. c. 53 (I))) and for enabling the Commissioners therein mentioned more effectually to execute the Trusts reposed in them.
Dublin Metropolitan Watch and Pawnbrokers Act 1800	40 Geo. 3. c. 62 (I)	1 August 1800
An Act for amending and making perpetual the several Laws for regulating the Watch in the District of the Metropolis, and for granting a further Duty upon Pawnbrokers.
Dealers' Licences Act 1800 (repealed)	40 Geo. 3. c. 63 (I)	1 August 1800
An Act for the better Regulation of, and securing the Duties payable on Licenses to Persons engaged in the several Trades therein mentioned, and to Hawkers and Pedlars, and the Duties on playing Cards, and for securing the Expences of distraining for the King's Rents, and for other Purposes. (Repealed by Statute Law Revision (Ireland) Act 1879 (42 & 43 Vict. c. 24))
Negotiation of Notes and Bills Act 1800	40 Geo. 3. c. 64 (I)	1 August 1800
An Act to continue and amend an Act, Entitled, "An Act to restrain the Negociation of Promissory Notes and Inland Bills of Exchange, under a limited Sum," (Note: Negotiation of Notes and Bills Act 1799 (39 Geo. 3. c. 48 (I))) passed in the last Session of Parliament.
Dublin Female Orphan House Act 1800	40 Geo. 3. c. 65 (I)	1 August 1800
An Act for Incorporating the Governors and Governesses of the Female Orphan House on the Circular Road near Dublin.
Association for Discountenancing Vice Act 1800	40 Geo. 3. c. 66 (I)	1 August 1800
An Act for incorporating the Association for discountenancing Vice, and promoting the Knowledge and Practice of the Christian Religion.
Distillers Act 1800 (repealed)	40 Geo. 3. c. 67 (I)	1 August 1800
An Act for regulating the Trade of a Distiller, and for securing the Duties payable on Home made Spirits. (Repealed by Statute Law Revision (Ireland) Act 1879 (42 & 43 Vict. c. 24))
Exciseable Goods Permits Act 1800 (repealed)	40 Geo. 3. c. 68 (I)	1 August 1800
An Act for better regulating the issuing and granting of Permits and Certificates for the Conveyance and Protection of certain Exciseable Goods therein mentioned, and to prevent Frauds by Dealers in, or Retailers of such Goods. (Repealed by Permits, etc. (Ireland) Act 1819 (59 Geo. 3. c. 107))
Judicial Salaries and Pensions Act (Ireland) 1800 (repealed)	40 Geo. 3. c. 69 (I)	1 August 1800
An Act to enable his Majesty to grant Annuities to the Lord High Chancellor and to the Judges of the Court of King's Bench, Master of the Rolls, Judges of the Courts of Common Pleas and Exchequer, Judge or Commissary of the Court of Prerogative, the Judge of the Court of Admiralty, the Chairman of the Quarter Sessions of the County of Dublin, and Assistant Barristers of the several other Counties, on the Resignation of their respective offices, and to amend an Act passed in the Thirty-sixth Year of his present Majesty, entitled, "An Act for encreasing the Salaries of the Chief and other Judges of the Courts of King's Bench and Common Pleas, and of the Chief Baron, and other Barons of the Court of Exchequer in this Kingdom." (Note: Judges Salaries Act (Ireland) 1796 (36 Geo. 3. c. 26 (I))) (Repealed for the Republic of Ireland by Statute Law Revision (Pre-Union Irish Statutes) Act 1962 (No. 29) and for Northern Ireland by Judicature (Northern Ireland) Act 1978 (c. 23))
Quit and Crown Rents Arrears Act 1800 (repealed)	40 Geo. 3. c. 70 (I)	1 August 1800
An Act for discharging certain Arrears of Quit, Crown, and Composition Rents, which have been growing due for Twenty Years before the Twenty-ninth Day of September, One thousand seven hundred and ninety-nine, on the Terms and in Manner therein mentioned. (Repealed by Statute Law Revision (Ireland) Act 1879 (42 & 43 Vict. c. 24))
Trespass of Cattle Act 1800 (repealed)	40 Geo. 3. c. 71 (I)	1 August 1800
An Act for amending and rendering more effectual an Act passed in the Thirty-seventh Year of his present Majesty, Entitled, "An Act to prevent vexatious impounding of Cattle for Trespass or Damage Feasant, and for the effectual preserving of Meares and Fences." (Note: Trespass of Cattle Act 1797 (37 Geo. 3. c. 36 (I))) (Repealed by Summary Jurisdiction (Ireland) Act 1851 (14 & 15 Vict. c. 92))
Juries Act 1800	40 Geo. 3. c. 72 (I)	1 August 1800
An Act for the better Regulation of Trials by Jury in the Courts of King's Bench, Common Pleas, and Exchequer, during Term, and in the Sittings after Term.
Liffey Walls Act 1800	40 Geo. 3. c. 73 (I)	1 August 1800
An Act for repealing so much of an Act, passed in the Thirty-second Year of his Majesty's Reign, (Note: City of Dublin Act 1792 (32 Geo. 3. c. 35 (I))) for repairing and preserving the Walls of the River Anna Liffey, in the City of Dublin, as imposes an additional Rate or Tax of two Shillings for each Foot of Ground, Part of the South Lots on the Front of Sir John Rogerson's Quay, in said Act specified.
Circular Road Act 1800	40 Geo. 3. c. 74 (I)	1 August 1800
An Act to amend and render more effectual the Laws now in Force for making and keeping in Repair a Circular Road round the City of Dublin.
Commissioners of Charitable Donations Act 1800	40 Geo. 3. c. 75 (I)	1 August 1800
An Act to amend an Act passed in the third Year of his present Majesty, King George the Third, Entitled, "An Act for the better discovery of charitable donations and bequests." (Note: Charitable Donations and Bequests Act 1763 (3 Geo. 3. c. 18 (I)))
Paper Duty Act 1800	40 Geo. 3. c. 76 (I)	1 August 1800
An Act for amending and continuing an Act, passed in the Thirty-eighth Year of his Majesty's Reign, to secure the Collection of the Duties on Paper made in Ireland, and to prevent Frauds therein.
Tobacco Act 1800	40 Geo. 3. c. 77 (I)	1 August 1800
An Act to amend and continue an Act, passed in the Thirty-seventh Year of his Majesty's Reign, Entitled, "An Act for regulating and extending the Tobacco Trade, and for securing the Duties payable upon the Import and Manufacture of Tobacco." (Note: Tobacco Act 1797 (37 Geo. 3. c. 42 (I)))
Tanning Act 1800 (repealed)	40 Geo. 3. c. 78 (I)	1 August 1800
An Act for amending an Act, passed in the last Session of Parliament, Entitled, "An Act to revive and continue the several Laws relating to the curing of Hides, and regulating the Sale of Hides and Calf Skins, and preventing Frauds in the selling thereof, and for preventing Frauds in the weighing and Delivery of Bark imported into this Kingdom." (Note: Hides, Skins, and Bark Regulation Act 1799 (39 Geo. 3. c. 61 (I))) (Repealed by Statute Law Revision (Ireland) Act 1879 (42 & 43 Vict. c. 24))
Quarantine Act 1800 (repealed)	40 Geo. 3. c. 79 (I)	1 August 1800
An Act to oblige Ships more effectually to perform their Quarantine, and to prevent the Plague and other infectious Distempers being brought into Ireland, and to hinder the spreading of Infection. (Repealed by Statute Law Revision (Ireland) Act 1879 (42 & 43 Vict. c. 24))
Parliamentary Elections Act 1800	40 Geo. 3. c. 80 (I)	1 August 1800
An Act to explain and amend an Act passed in the Thirty-fifth Year of his present Majesty's Reign, Entitled, "An Act for regulating the Election of Members to serve in Parliament, and for repealing the several Acts therein mentioned," (Note: Parliamentary Elections Act 1795 (35 Geo. 3. c. 29 (I))) and to explain and amend an Act passed in the Thirty-seventh Year of said Reign, Entitled, "An Act for the further Regulation of Election of Members to serve in Parliament." (Note: Parliamentary Elections Act 1797 (37 Geo. 3. c. 47 (I)))
Tithes Recovery Act 1800 (repealed)	40 Geo. 3. c. 81 (I)	1 August 1800
An Act to enable all Ecclesiastical Persons and Bodies, Rectors, Vicars, and Curates, and Impropriators, and those deriving by, from, or under them, to recover a just Compensation for the Tithes withheld from them in the Year One thousand seven hundred and ninety-nine, against such Persons as were liable to the same. (Repealed by Statute Law Revision (Ireland) Act 1879 (42 & 43 Vict. c. 24))
Glebe Lands Act 1800	40 Geo. 3. c. 82 (I)	1 August 1800
An Act for the further Encouragement of building and improving on Glebe Lands.
Churches and Chapels Building Act 1800 (repealed)	40 Geo. 3. c. 83 (I)	1 August 1800
An Act to facilitate the building and re-building of Churches and Chapels. (Repealed by Statute Law Revision (Ireland) Act 1879 (42 & 43 Vict. c. 24))
Royal College of Physicians, Ireland, Act 1800^{(Republic of Ireland)} or the School of Physic Act 1800	40 Geo. 3. c. 84 (I)	1 August 1800
An Act for repealing an Act passed in the twenty-fifth Year of his present Majesty, entitled, "An Act for establishing a complete School of Physic in this Kingdom;" (Note: School of Physic Act 1785 (25 Geo. 3. c. 42 (I))) and also for repealing an Act passed in the thirty-first Year of his present Majesty, (Note: School of Physic Act 1791 (31 Geo. 3. c. 35 (I))) entitled, "An Act to explain and amend an Act for establishing a complete School of Physic in this Kingdom,'" and also for extending and enlarging the Powers of the President and Fellows of the King and Queen's College of Physicians, and establishing a complete School of Physic in this Kingdom.
Maynooth College Act 1800^{(Republic of Ireland)}	40 Geo. 3. c. 85 (I)	1 August 1800
An Act for the better Government of the Seminary established at Maynooth, for the Education of Persons professing the Roman Catholic Religion, and for amending the Laws now in Force respecting the said Seminary.
Coffee Act 1800 (repealed)	40 Geo. 3. c. 86 (I)	1 August 1800
An Act to continue an Act passed in the Thirty-seventh Year of his Majesty's Reign, Entitled, "An Act for regulating the Import, Export, and Sale of Coffee, and securing the Duties payable thereon." (Note: Coffee Act 1797 (37 Geo. 3. c. 52 (I))) (Repealed by Statute Law Revision (Ireland) Act 1879 (42 & 43 Vict. c. 24))
Auctions Act 1800 (repealed)	40 Geo. 3. c. 87 (I)	1 August 1800
An Act to continue and amend two several Acts passed in the Thirty-eighth (Note: Auctions, &c. Act 1798 (38 Geo. 3. c. 24 (I))) and Thirty-ninth (Note: Auctions, &c. Act 1799 (39 Geo. 3. c. 24 (I))) Years of the Reign of his present Majesty, to secure the Collection of the Duties on Auctions and on Glass Bottles, and on Paper printed, painted, or stained, to serve for Hangings, and other Uses. (Repealed by Statute Law Revision (Ireland) Act 1879 (42 & 43 Vict. c. 24))
Highways Act 1800 (repealed)	40 Geo. 3. c. 88 (I)	1 August 1800
An Act to amend an Act (Note: Highways Act 1796 (36 Geo. 3. c. 55 (I))) for Repair of the public Roads, and to revive and explain an Act (Note: Highways Act 1770 (11 Geo. 3. c. 9 (I))) for holding Vestries in the Province of Ulster, and for empowering the Lord Lieutenant, or other Chief Governor, to reduce the Expence of the Police Establishment. (Repealed by Statute Law Revision (Ireland) Act 1879 (42 & 43 Vict. c. 24))
Indemnity and Insurrections Act 1800 (repealed)	40 Geo. 3. c. 89 (I)	1 August 1800
An Act for indemnifying such Persons as have acted since the first Day of June, one thousand seven hundred and ninety-nine, for the Preservation of the public Peace, and Suppression of the Insurrections prevailing in some Parts of this Kingdom, and to enable Sheriffs and other Officers to make the Returns therein specified. (Repealed by Statute Law Revision (Ireland) Act 1879 (42 & 43 Vict. c. 24))
Leases for Cotton Manufacture Act 1800^{(Republic of Ireland)}	40 Geo. 3. c. 90 (I)	1 August 1800
An Act for the further Encouragement of the Cotton Manufacture, by enabling Tenants for Life to make Leases for Suites of Mills.
Militia (No. 2) Act (Ireland) 1800 (repealed)	40 Geo. 3. c. 91 (I)	1 August 1800
An Act to empower the Colonels or Commanding Officers of the Militia of this Kingdom to continue in the Service such Men as shall be entitled to their Discharge before the twenty-fourth Day of June, one thousand eight hundred and one, and as shall be willing to re-enlist before their Time of Service shall expire. (Repealed by Statute Law Revision (Ireland) Act 1879 (42 & 43 Vict. c. 24))
Militia (No. 3) Act (Ireland) 1800 (repealed)	40 Geo. 3. c. 92 (I)	1 August 1800
An Act for amending an Act passed in this Kingdom in the Thirty-third Year of his Majesty's Reign, Entitled, "An Act for amending and reducing into one Act of Parliament, the Laws relating to the Militia in Ireland." (Note: Militia Act (Ireland) 1793 (33 Geo. 3. c. 22 (I))) (Repealed by Militia (Ireland) Act 1809 (49 Geo. 3. c. 120))
Road in Waterford Act 1800	40 Geo. 3. c. 93 (I)	1 August 1800
An Act to amend an Act passed in the Thirty-sixth Year of his Majesty's Reign, Entitled, "An Act for repairing the Road commonly called or known by the Name of the Military Road, beginning at the County and City Court-Houses in the City of Waterford, and leading from thence to the Town of Tallagh, in the County of Waterford, through the Towns of Kilmacthomas, Cappoquin and Lismore, and from Tallagh aforesaid, to the Bounds of the County of Cork." (Note: Road in Waterford Act 1796 (36 Geo. 3. c. 13 (I)))
Roads in Dublin, Kildare, Limerick and Cork Act 1800	40 Geo. 3. c. 94 (I)	1 August 1800
An Act to amend an Act passed in the Thirty-eighth Year of his Majesty's Reign, (Note: Road from Dublin to Kilcullen Act 1798 (38 Geo. 3. c. 83 (I))) Entitled, "An Act to explain and reduce into one Act the several Laws for making, improving, and repairing the Turnpike Road leading from the City of Dublin to Kilcullen-Bridge, in the County of Kildare, and to the Twenty-one Mile Stone Westward of the said Bridge, and for prolonging the Duration of the Act (Note: Roads in Queen's County, &c. Act 1793 (33 Geo. 3. c. 32) for repairing the Road from Naas to Limerick, and for the further Improvement of the Road from Kilworth Mountain to the City of Cork."
Roads in Limerick Act 1800	40 Geo. 3. c. 95 (I)	1 August 1800
An Act to explain and amend an Act, Entitled, "An Act to explain and amend, and reduce into one Act, the several Laws for making, repairing, or amending the Turnpike Roads leading from the Town of Naas to the Towns of Maryborough and Ballyroan, from the Town of Maryborough to the City of Limerick, and from the Town of Nenagh to O'Brien's-Bridge, and to enable Grand Juries to present Sums to recompence the Proprietors through whose Lands new Lines of Road have been run." (Note: Roads in Queen's County, &c. Act 1793 (33 Geo. 3. c. 32 (I)))
Cork and Dublin Coalyards Act 1800 (repealed)	40 Geo. 3. c. 96 (I)	1 August 1800
An Act to revive, continue, or make perpetual certain Temporary Statutes. (Repealed by Statute Law Revision (Ireland) Act 1879 (42 & 43 Vict. c. 24))
Louth (Enclosure of Common of Dromiskin) Act 1800 or the County of Louth Act 1800	40 Geo. 3. c. 97 (I)	1 August 1800
An Act for dividing, allotting, and enclosing the Commons, Commonable and Waste Lands of Dromiskin, within the Parish of Dromiskin, in the County of Louth.
Road from Tubber to Limerick Act 1800	40 Geo. 3. c. 98 (I)	1 August 1800
An Act for improving and repairing the Roads leading from Tubber, near the Bounds of the Counties of Clare and Galway to Ennis, in the County of Clare, and from thence to Thomond-Gate, in the County of the City of Limerick.
Sligo Improvement Act 1800	40 Geo. 3. c. 99 (I)	1 August 1800
An Act for paving, cleansing, lighting, and improving the Streets, Quays, Lanes, and Passages, in the Town of Sligo, in the County of Sligo, for establishing a nightly Watch in said Town, for supplying the said Town with Pipe Water, and for improving and regulating the Port and Harbour thereof.
City of Cork (Butter Market) Act 1800^{(Republic of Ireland)} or the City of Cork Act 1800	40 Geo. 3. c. 100 (I)	1 August 1800
An Act for the better Regulation of the Butter Trade of the City of Cork, and the Liberties thereof, and for the better Regulation of the said City in other Matters therein mentioned, and in respect to Lighters and Vessels plying for Hire, and also respecting Sedan Chairs, Coaches, and Chaises plying for Hire within the City and Liberties of the City of Cork.

=== Private acts ===
Short title, or popular name	Citation	Royal assent
Long title
Nevill's Estate Act 1800	40 Geo. 3. c. 1 Pr. (I)	1 August 1800
An Act for vesting certain lands, tenements and hereditaments in the counties of Kildare, Wexford and county of Dublin, the estate of Richard Nevill, esquire, in trustees, for the purposes therein mentioned.
Bolton's Estate Act 1800	40 Geo. 3. c. 2 Pr. (I)	1 August 1800
An Act for vesting certain lands therein mentioned, the estate of Cornelius Bolton of Faithlegg in the county of Waterford, esquire, in trustees for payment of the debts and encumbrances affecting the same, and for other purposes therein mentioned.
Wyse Estates Act 1800^{(Republic of Ireland)}	40 Geo. 3. c. 3 Pr. (I)	1 August 1800
An Act to enable Thomas Wyse of Saint John's in the liberties of the city of Waterford, esquire, and the other persons therein named, when they shall be respectively in possession of the lands and premises therein mentioned, part of the estates of Thomas Wyse the elder, late of Saint John's aforesaid, deceased, to make a lease or leases for lives, with or without covenants renewable forever, or for any term or time not exceeding 999 years, of the said estates, houses and lands in the city of Waterford and liberties thereof, and to make leases for three lives or 31 years, whichever should last longest, of certain lands, houses and premises in the Queen's County and county of Waterford, now in the possession of the said Thomas Wyse.
Harvey's Estate Act 1800	40 Geo. 3. c. 4 Pr. (I)	1 August 1800
An Act to enable certain trustees therein named to raise such sums of money on the estates devised by the will of the late Reverend John Harvey of Malinhall in the county of Donegal, clerk, as may be necessary for obtaining renewal of certain freehold and leasehold interests devised by the said will, and for other purposes therein mentioned.
Lambert's Estate Act 1800	40 Geo. 3. c. 5 Pr. (I)	1 August 1800
An Act for the sale of the settled estate of Walter Lambert of Castle Lambert in the county of Galway, esquire, and of Thomas, Walter, Persse and John Lambert, first, second, third and fourth sons of said Walter Lambert, for the payment of certain encumbrances affecting the same, and for other purposes therein mentioned.
Montgomery's Divorce Act 1800	40 Geo. 3. c. 6 Pr. (I)	1 August 1800
An Act to dissolve the marriage of Alexander Montgomery, esquire, captain in his majesty's Monaghan regiment of militia, with Mary Montgomery, otherwise Chute, his now wife, and to enable him to marry again.
Blake's Estate Act 1800	40 Geo. 3. c. 7 Pr. (I)	1 August 1800
An Act for vesting in trustees the estates and lands of John Blake of Forbough in the county of Galway, esquire, situate in the county of Galway and county of the town of Galway, for raising a sufficient sum of money for discharging the debts and encumbrances which affected the same, at the time of his marriage with Maria Blake, otherwise Galway, his present wife, and for other purposes.
Annesley's Divorce Act 1800	40 Geo. 3. c. 8 Pr. (I)	1 August 1800
An Act to dissolve the marriage of Charles Annesley, esquire, with Sarah Annesley, otherwise Carter, his now wife, and to enable him to marry again, and for other purposes therein mentioned.
Lynch's Estate Act 1800	40 Geo. 3. c. 9 Pr. (I)	1 August 1800
An Act for vesting in trustees certain lands situate in the county of Galway, the estate of Mark Lynch in Drimcong in the said county, esquire, for raising a sum of money to discharge the debts and encumbrances affecting the same, and for other purposes therein mentioned.
Viscount Mountjoy's Estate Act 1800	40 Geo. 3. c. 10 Pr. (I)	1 August 1800
An Act for vesting certain estates and lands belonging to Charles John, Lord Viscount Mountjoy, in the counties of Antrim, Kilkenny, Carlow and Wicklow and city of Kilkenny, in trustees, in order to sell the same and to apply the purchase money in buying in certain debts and encumbrances affecting the estates of Luke, late Lord Viscount Mountjoy, in the county of Tyrone, to be applied for the purposes therein mentioned, and for other purposes.

=== Sources ===
- "The Fortieth year of George III". Statutes Passed in the Parliaments Held in Ireland. Vol. XXI: From the Thirty-nineth Year of George III. A.D. 1799, to the Fortieth Year of George III. A.D. 1800, inclusive. Dublin: George Grierson. 1801. pp. 1–429 – via Google Books.
- "Acts of Parliament by Session: 1800". Irish Legislation Database. Queen's University Belfast.
- "Pre-Union Irish Statutes: 1800 Acts". Irish Statute Book. Attorney General of Ireland.

== See also ==
- List of acts of the Parliament of Ireland
- List of acts of the Oireachtas
- List of legislation in the United Kingdom
