= Statute Law Revision (Ireland) Act 1879 =

Act of the Parliament of the United Kingdom

Statute Law Revision (Ireland) Act 1879 (Note: Section 2.)
- Act of Parliament
- Parliament of the United Kingdom
- Long title: An Act for the Revision of the Statute Law of Ireland.
- Citation: 42 & 43 Vict. c. 24
- Introduced by: Edward Gibson MP (Commons); Hugh Cairns, 1st Earl Cairns (Lords)
- Territorial extent: United Kingdom

Dates
- Royal assent: 3 July 1879
- Commencement: 3 July 1879 (Note: The Acts of Parliament (Commencement) Act 1793.)
Other legislation
Amends	See § Repealed enactments
Repeals/revokes	See § Repealed enactments
Amended by	Statute Law Revision Act 1894
Relates to	Repeal of Acts Concerning Importation Act 1822; Repeal of Obsolete Statutes Act 1856; See Statute Law Revision Act

Status: Partially repealed

History of passage through Parliament

Records of Parliamentary debate relating to the statute from Hansard

Text of statute as originally enacted

The Statute Law Revision (Ireland) Act 1879 (42 & 43 Vict. c. 24), sometimes called the Irish Statute Law Revision Act, is an act of the Parliament of the United Kingdom that repealed for Ireland enactments of the Parliament of Ireland from 1537 to 1800 which had ceased to be in force or had become necessary. The act was intended, in particular, to facilitate the preparation of the revised edition of the Irish statutes, then in progress.

== Background ==
In the United Kingdom, acts of Parliament remain in force until expressly repealed. Blackstone's Commentaries on the Laws of England, published in the late 18th-century, raised questions about the system and structure of the common law and the poor drafting and disorder of the existing statute book.

From 1810 to 1825, The Statutes of the Realm was published, providing the first authoritative collection of acts. The first statute law revision act was not passed until 1856 with the Repeal of Obsolete Statutes Act 1856 (19 & 20 Vict. c. 64). This approach – focusing on removing obsolete laws from the statute book followed by consolidation – was proposed by Peter Locke King MP, who had been highly critical of previous commissions' approaches, expenditures, and lack of results.

Previous statute law revision acts
Year passed	Title	Citation	Effect
1861	Statute Law Revision Act 1861	24 & 25 Vict. c. 101	Repealed or amended over 800 enactments
1863	Statute Law Revision Act 1863	26 & 27 Vict. c. 125	Repealed or amended over 1,600 enactments for England and Wales
1867	Statute Law Revision Act 1867	30 & 31 Vict. c. 59	Repealed or amended over 1,380 enactments
1870	Statute Law Revision Act 1870	33 & 34 Vict. c. 69	Repealed or amended over 250 enactments
1871	Promissory Oaths Act 1871	34 & 35 Vict. c. 48	Repealed or amended almost 200 enactments
1871	Statute Law Revision Act 1871	34 & 35 Vict. c. 116	Repealed or amended over 1,060 enactments
1872	Statute Law Revision Act 1872	35 & 36 Vict. c. 63	Repealed or amended almost 490 enactments
1872	Statute Law (Ireland) Revision Act 1872	35 & 36 Vict. c. 98	Repealed or amended over 1,050 enactments
1872	Statute Law Revision Act 1872 (No. 2)	35 & 36 Vict. c. 97	Repealed or amended almost 260 enactments
1873	Statute Law Revision Act 1873	36 & 37 Vict. c. 91	Repealed or amended 1,225 enactments
1874	Statute Law Revision Act 1874	37 & 38 Vict. c. 35	Repealed or amended over 490 enactments
1874	Statute Law Revision Act 1874 (No. 2)	37 & 38 Vict. c. 96	Repealed or amended almost 470 enactments
1875	Statute Law Revision Act 1875	38 & 39 Vict. c. 66	Repealed or amended over 1,400 enactments
1876	Statute Law Revision (Substituted Enactments) Act 1876	39 & 40 Vict. c. 20	Updated references to repealed acts
1878	Statute Law Revision (Ireland) Act 1878	41 & 42 Vict. c. 57	Repealed or amended over 460 enactments passed by the Parliament of Ireland
1878	Statute Law Revision Act 1878	41 & 42 Vict. c. 79	Repealed or amended over 90 enactments.

== Passage ==
Leave to bring in the Statute Law Revision (Ireland) Bill was granted to the Attorney-General for Ireland, Edward Gibson MP had its first reading in the House of Commons on 23 April 1879. The bill had its second reading in the House of Commons on 7 May 1879 and was committed to a committee of the whole house, which met and reported on 8 May 1879, without amendments. The bill had its third reading in the House of Commons on 10 May 1879 and passed, without amendments.

The re-introduced Statute Law Revision (Ireland) Bill had its first reading in the House of Lords on 12 May 1879. The bill had its second reading in the House of Lords on 13 May 1879, introduced by the Lord Chancellor, Hugh Cairns, 1st Earl Cairns, and was committed to a committee of the whole house, which met and reported on 27 May 1879, without amendments. The bill had its third reading in the House of Lords on 29 May 1879 and passed, without amendments.

The bill was granted royal assent on 3 July 1879.

== Subsequent developments ==
The act was intended, in particular, to facilitate the preparation of a revised edition of the Irish statutes, however no further Statute Law Revision Acts for Ireland were passed in the 19th century.

The schedule to the act was repealed by section 1 of, and the first schedule to, the Statute Law Revision Act 1894 (57 & 58 Vict. c. 54), which came into force on 25 August 1894.

The act was retained for the Republic of Ireland by section 2(2)(a) of, and part 4 of schedule 1 to, the Statute Law Revision Act 2007, which came into force on 8 May 2007.

The savings in the act were considered to be complex. As to savings in this act, see Queen v Justices of Meath. As to amendments by this act, see The State (O'Connor) v O'Caomh-Anaigh.

== Repealed enactments ==
Section 1 of the act repealed 1,023 enactments, listed in the schedule to the act, across six categories: (Note: The Note of the bill, unlike the schedule, gives commentary on each act, noting any earlier repeals and the reason for the new repeal.)

- Expired
- Spent
- Repealed in general terms
- Virtually repealed
- Superseded
- Obsolete

Section 1 of the act included several safeguards to ensure that the repeal does not negatively affect existing rights or ongoing legal matters. Specifically, any legal rights, privileges, or remedies already obtained under the repealed laws, as well as any legal proceedings or principles established by them, remain unaffected. Section 1 of the act also ensured that repealed enactments that have been incorporated into other laws would continue to have legal effect in those contexts. Moreover, the repeal would not revive any former rights, offices, or jurisdictions that had already been abolished.

Citation	Short title	Title	Extent of repeal
28 Hen. 8. c. 7 (I)	Treason Act (Ireland) 1537	An Act of Slander.	Section Two. Section Three to "committed within the limits of this realm; and". Section Four, except as to Outlawry. Sections Five and Six.
28 Hen. 8. c. 20 (I)	N/A	An Act declaring the Effect of Poynings Act.	The whole act.
12 Eliz. 1. c. 4 (I)	Irishry and Degenerate English Lands Act 1570	An Act authorising the Governour for the time being,—Her Majestie, Her Heyres and Successours, certaine reservations, &c.	The whole act.
28 Eliz. 1. c. 1 (I)	Perjury Act 1586	An Act concerning wilful Perjurie.	Section two, so far as it relates to the appropriation of penalty. Section four. Section six from "given by Acte of Parliament" to "Ulster, nor".
10 Chas. 1 Sess. 3. c. 9 (I)	Creditors Relief Act 1634	An Act for relief of Creditors against such persons as dye in Execution.	The whole act.
10 Chas. 1 Sess. 3. c. 18 (I)	Sheriffs Act 1634	An Act for the Swearing of Under-Sheriffs and other Officers.	Section four from "the one Moiety" to the end of the section. Section five from "in which Action" to the end of the section.
7 Will. 3. c. 7 (I)	Suits and Delays Act 1695	An Act for reviving two Statutes lately expired, and making them perpetual; and for avoiding unnecessary Suites and Delays.	The whole act.
7 Will. 3. c. 9 (I)	Profane Oaths Act 1695	An Act for the more effectual suppressing of Profane Cursing and Swearing.	Section one, so far as it relates to the appropriation of penalties.
7 Will. 3. c. 17 (I)	Sunday Observance Act 1695	An Act for the better Observation of the Lord's-Day, commonly called Sunday.	Section three, from "and in default" to "hours"; and so far as it relates to the appropriation of penalties. Section five.
7 Will. 3. c. 24 (I)	N/A	An Act for the better Regulating of Measures in and throughout this Kingdom.	The whole act.
10 Will. 3. c. 2 (I)	Butter and Butter Casks Act 1698	An Act for reforming Abuses in making of Butter Casks, and preventing of False Packing of Butter.	Sections three to six.
2 Anne c. 2 (I)	N/A	An Act for encouraging the Importation of Iron and Staves.	The whole act.
2 Anne c. 15 (I)	Sale of Livestock Act 1703	An Act to prohibit Butchers from being Graziers, and to redress several Abuses in Buying and Selling of Cattle; and in the Slaughtering and Packing of Beef, Tallow, and Hides.	Section seven. Sections nine to eleven. Section thirteen, from "and upon the Conviction" to the end of the section. Section sixteen.
2 Anne c. 17 (I)	N/A	An Act to Supply the Defects of an Act past in the Seventh Year of the late King William, intituled, "An Act for the better regulating of Measures in and throughout this Kingdom."	The whole act.
6 Anne c. 12 (I)	N/A	An Act for the continuing and perpetuating of divers Laws and Statutes heretofore temporary, and for amending of the Law in relation to Butter Casks.	Section one.
8 Anne c. 4 (I)	N/A	An Act to enable Posthumous Children to take Estates, as if born in their Father's Lifetime.	Section One.
8 Anne c. 8 (I)	N/A	An Act for the encouraging the discovery and apprehending of Housebreakers.	The whole act.
9 Anne c. 7 (I)	N/A	An Act for amending and making perpetual,—Beef, Tallow, and Hides.	Section One, so far as it is not already repealed.
11 Anne c. 8 (I)	Sheriffs Act 1712	An Act for explaining and amending several Statutes for prohibiting Under Sheriffs and Sheriffs Clarks from officiating as Sub-sheriffs or Sheriffs Clerks more than one year.	Section Three, from "that he has not taken" to "preceding Sheriff, and". Section Seven, from "in which" to end of the Section.
2 Geo. 1. c. 9 (I)	Militia Act (Ireland) 1715	An Act to make the Militia of this Kingdom more useful.	The whole act.
2 Geo. 1. c. 10 (I)	N/A	An Act to restrain Parishes from being Petty Constables, and for the better regulating the Parish Watches.	The whole act.
2 Geo. 1. c. 16 (I)	Packing of Tallow Act 1715	An Act for the more effectual Amendment of the Law in relation to Butter and Tallow Casks,—Beef, Tallow, and Hides.	Sections Seven to Nine.
2 Geo. 1. c. 17 (I)	N/A	An Act to impower Justices of the Peace to determine Disputes about Servants, Artificers, Day-Labourers, Wages, and other Payments, and to oblige Masters to pay the same, and to punish idle and disorderly Servants.	Section Seven, so far as it relates to the Appropriation of Penalty. Section Eighteen.
6 Geo. 1. c. 6 (I)	N/A	An Act to prevent delays in Writs of Error, and for the further Amendment of the Law.	Sections One to Four.
6 Geo. 1. c. 15 (I)	N/A	An Act for the more effectual Amendment of the Pavements,—Hackney Coaches and Chairs in the said City.	Sections Six and Seven.
8 Geo. 1. c. 6 (I)	N/A	An Act for the further Amendment of the Law, and for continuing and amending several Acts near expiring.	Sections One and Nine.
9 Geo. 2. c. 8 (I)	Tippling Act 1735	An Act to prevent the evil arising by the Retailers of Beer, Ale, Brandy, Rum, Geneva, Aquavitæ, and other Spirituous Liquors, giving credit to Servants, Day-Labourers, and other Persons, who usually work or ply for Hire or Wages.	Section Two.
15 Geo. 2. c. 4 (I)	N/A	An Act for allowing further Time to Persons in Offices or Employments to qualify themselves pursuant to an Act to prevent the further growth of Popery.	The whole act.
21 Geo. 2. c. 18 (I)	N/A	An Act for repairing the Roads,—Gads commonly called long Gads.	Section Fifteen.
23 Geo. 2. c. 1 (I)	N/A	An Act for granting and continuing to His Majesty an additional Duty on Beer,—Great Britain.	The whole act.
23 Geo. 2. c. 2 (I)	N/A	An Act for payment of the principal Sums,—Two hundred and fifty thousand Pounds.	The whole act.
23 Geo. 2. c. 3 (I)	N/A	An Act for continuing and amending several Laws heretofore made relating to His Majesty's Revenue, and for the more effectual preventing of Frauds in His Majesty's Customs and Excise.	The whole act.
23 Geo. 2. c. 4 (I)	N/A	An Act for licensing Hawkers and Pedlars, and for the encouragement of English Protestant Schools.	The whole act.
23 Geo. 2. c. 5 (I)	N/A	An Act for granting and continuing to His Majesty several duties upon Coaches, Berlins, Chariots, Calashes, Chaises, and Chairs, and upon Cards and Dice, and upon wrought and manufactured Gold and Silver Plate, for the purposes herein mentioned.	The whole act.
23 Geo. 2. c. 7 (I)	N/A	An Act for allowing further Time to Persons in Offices or Employments to qualify themselves pursuant to an Act intituled "An Act to prevent the further growth of Popery."	The whole act.
23 Geo. 2. c. 8 (I)	N/A	An Act for continuing several temporary Statutes.	The whole act.
23 Geo. 2. c. 11 (I)	N/A	An Act to provide for begging Children, and for the better regulation of Charity Schools, and for taking up vagrant and offensive Beggars in the City of Dublin and liberties thereof, and the liberties thereto adjoyning.	The whole act.
23 Geo. 2. c. 12 (I)	N/A	An Act for amending, continuing, and making more effectual,—Parish Clerks.	Sections One to Eight, and Thirteen to Sixteen.
23 Geo. 2. c. 13 (I)	N/A	An Act for the better screening the Persons who have served or hereafter shall serve in the Office of Sheriff in this Kingdom against the defaults and neglects of their Sub-sheriffs and Attornies.	Section Four, so far as it relates to the appropriation of penalty.
23 Geo. 2. c. 14 (I)	N/A	An Act for Amendment of the Law, in relation to the appointing High and Petty Constables.	The whole act.
23 Geo. 2. c. 15 (I)	N/A	An Act for continuing and amending,—Several Markets in this Kingdom.	Section Two, so far as it relates to appropriation of penalty, and from "wherein no essoign" to "allowed," and Section Six.
23 Geo. 2. c. 16 (I)	N/A	An Act for the more effectual amending and keeping in Repair the several Turnpike Roads in this Kingdom; and for better securing the Creditors of the said Roads.	The whole act.
23 Geo. 2. c. 17 (I)	N/A	An Act for the Relief of Insolvent Debtors.	The whole act.
25 Geo. 2. c. 1 (I)	N/A	An Act for granting and continuing to His Majesty an additional Duty on Beer,—Great Britain.	The whole act.
25 Geo. 2. c. 2 (I)	N/A	An Act for Payment of the Principal Sum,—Twenty-fifth day of December One thousand seven hundred and fifty-one.	The whole act.
25 Geo. 2. c. 3 (I)	N/A	An Act to continue the Parliament for Three Years whensoever and as often as the Crown shall descend to any of the Children of His late Royal Highness Frederick Prince of Wales, being under the age of Eighteen Years, unless it shall be dissolved before that time.	The whole act.
25 Geo. 2. c. 4 (I)	N/A	An Act for licensing Hawkers and Pedlars, and for the encouragement of English Protestant Schools.	The whole act.
25 Geo. 2. c. 5 (I)	Game Act 1751	An Act for the better Preservation of the Game.	The whole act.
25 Geo. 2. c. 6 (I)	N/A	An Act for continuing several temporary Statutes now near expiring.	The whole act.
25 Geo. 2. c. 7 (I)	N/A	An Act for allowing further Time to Persons in Offices or Employments to qualify themselves pursuant to an Act intituled "An Act to prevent the further growth of Popery."	The whole act.
25 Geo. 2. c. 8 (I)	Apprentices Act 1751	An Act for the better adjusting and more easy recovery of the Wages,—and one against the other.	Section Six to "others' and". Section nine.
25 Geo. 2. c. 9 (I)	N/A	An Act for continuing and amending several Laws heretofore made relating to His Majesty's Revenue, and for the more effectual preventing of Frauds in His Majesty's Customs and Excise.	Sections One and Six.
25 Geo. 2. c. 10 (I)	N/A	An Act for amending an Act intituled An Act for encouragement of Tillage,—out of this Kingdom for Pounage.	The whole act.
25 Geo. 2. c. 12 (I)	Enforcement of Court Orders Act 1751	An Act for the more effectual Execution of Orders of the Courts of Justice for giving and quieting Possessions; and also for the more effectual bringing to Justice such Persons as shall enlist His Majesty's Subjects to serve as Soldiers in Foreign Service without Licence.	Except Section Four to "Majesty's consent".
25 Geo. 2. c. 14 (I)	N/A	An Act to explain and amend an Act passed in the Ninth Year of the Reign of His present Majesty,—Clerks of the Crown and Peace.	The whole act.
25 Geo. 2. c. 15 (I)	Weights and Measures Act 1751	An Act for buying and selling of all sorts of Corn and Meal and other things therein mentioned by weight, and for the more effectual preventing the Frauds committed in the buying and selling thereof.	Sections Three, Ten, and Thirteen so far as they relate to the appropriation of penalties; Sections Four, Eight, Nine, Eleven, and Fourteen.
25 Geo. 2. c. 16 (I)	N/A	An Act for explaining and amending the several Laws now in being relating to the Workhouse of the City of Dublin, so far as the same relates to the Rates of Hackney Coaches, and Hackney Coachmen, and Sedan Chairs and Chairmen in and about the said City.	The whole act.
27 Geo. 2. c. 1 (I)	N/A	An Act for granting and continuing to His Majesty an additional Duty on Beer,—Great Britain.	The whole act.
27 Geo. 2. c. 2 (I)	N/A	An Act for continuing, altering, and amending the Laws in relation to the Flaxen and Hempen Manufactures.	The whole act.
29 Geo. 2. c. 1 (I)	N/A	An Act for granting and continuing to His Majesty an additional Duty on Beer,—Great Britain.	The whole act.
29 Geo. 2. c. 2 (I)	N/A	An Act for allowing further Time to Persons in Offices or Employments to qualify themselves pursuant to an Act intituled "An Act to prevent the further growth of Popery."	The whole act.
29 Geo. 2. c. 3 (I)	N/A	An Act for continuing and amending several Laws heretofore made relating to His Majesty's Revenue, and for the more effectual preventing of Frauds in His Majesty's Customs and Excise.	Sections One and Six.
29 Geo. 2. c. 4 (I)	N/A	An Act for licensing Hawkers and Pedlars, and for encouragement of English Protestant Schools.	The whole act.
29 Geo. 2. c. 6 (I)	Juries Act 1755	An Act for better regulating Juries.	The whole act.
29 Geo. 2. c. 7 (I)	N/A	An Act for amending an Act passed in the twelfth year of the reign of His late Majesty King George the First, intituled "An Act for the more effectual erecting and better regulating of Free Schools, and for rebuilding and repairing of Churches."	The whole act.
29 Geo. 2. c. 8 (I)	Apprentices Act 1755	An Act for continuing several temporary Statutes,—Destruction of Salmon.	Except Section Thirteen to "Warrants of the Justices of the Peace".
29 Geo. 2. c. 9 (I)	Tillage Act 1755	An Act for the further encouragement of Tillage.	The whole act.
29 Geo. 2. c. 10 (I)	N/A	An Act for amending an Act passed in the twenty-fifth year of His present Majesty's reign,—out of this Kingdom for England.	The whole act.
29 Geo. 2. c. 12 (I)	N/A	An Act to prevent unlawful Combinations of Tenants, Colliers, Miners, and others,—on Ships or Boats.	Sections Three to Eight. Section Thirteen.
29 Geo. 2. c. 14 (I)	N/A	An Act for removing Doubts touching the Presentments of Money in the Court of King's Bench; and for raising of Money for building and repairing Houses of Correction.	Except as to the County of the City of Dublin.
29 Geo. 2. c. 15 (I)	Sheriffs Act 1755	An Act to supply the Defects of an Act passed in the Eleventh Year of the Reign of the late Majesty Queen Anne intituled "An Act for explaining and amending several Statutes for prohibiting Under-Sheriffs and Sheriffs Clerks from officiating as Sub-Sheriffs or Sheriffs Clerks more than One Year."	Sections One and Two.
29 Geo. 2. c. 16 (I)	N/A	An Act for promoting Publick Credit.	Section Four.
29 Geo. 2. c. 17 (I)	Insolvent Debtors Relief Act 1755	An Act for the Relief of Insolvent Debtors.	The whole act.
29 Geo. 2. c. 24 (I)	N/A	An Act to make it lawful for His Majesty's Protestant Dissenting Subjects of this Kingdom to accept of and hold Commissions in the Militia, and to act in Commission of Array.	The whole act.
31 Geo. 2. c. 1 (I)	N/A	An Act for granting and continuing to His Majesty an additional Duty on Beer,—Great Britain.	The whole act.
31 Geo. 2. c. 2 (I)	N/A	An Act to prevent the distilling of Spirits from Wheat, Oats, Bear, Barley, Malt, Beans, and Pease, or from any Potatoes, Meal, or Flour of Wheat, Oats, Bear, Barley, Malt, Beans, or Pease, for a limited Time.	The whole act.
31 Geo. 2. c. 3 (I)	N/A	An Act for better supplying the City of Dublin with Corn and Flour.	The whole act.
31 Geo. 2. c. 4 (I)	N/A	An Act for allowing further Time to Persons in Offices or Employments to qualify themselves pursuant to an Act intituled "An Act to prevent the further growth of Popery."	The whole act.
31 Geo. 2. c. 6 (I)	N/A	An Act for continuing and amending several Laws heretofore made relating to His Majesty's Revenue, and for the more effectual preventing of Frauds in His Majesty's Customs and Excise.	The whole act.
31 Geo. 2. c. 7 (I)	N/A	An Act for licensing Hawkers and Pedlars, and for encouragement of English Protestant Schools.	The whole act.
31 Geo. 2. c. 9 (I)	N/A	An Act for reviving, continuing, and amending several temporary Statutes.	The whole act.
31 Geo. 2. c. 10 (I)	N/A	An Act for the more effectual preventing of Frauds and Abuses,—Bay-yarn exported to Great Britain.	Sections Eleven and Twelve.
31 Geo. 2. c. 11 (I)	N/A	An Act more effectually to enable the Clergy having Cure of Souls to reside upon their respective Benefices, and to build upon their respective Glebe Lands.	The whole act.
31 Geo. 2. c. 14 (I)	Collieries Act 1757	An Act for the better supplying the City of Dublin with Coals, and for the better encouragement of the Collieries of this Kingdom.	The whole act.
33 Geo. 2. c. 1 (I)	N/A	An Act for granting and continuing to His Majesty an additional Duty on Beer,—Great Britain.	The whole act.
33 Geo. 2. c. 2 (I)	N/A	An Act for granting to His Majesty a further additional Duty on Wine,—the said Principal Sums.	The whole act.
33 Geo. 2. c. 3 (I)	N/A	An Act for allowing further Time to Persons in Offices or Employments to qualify themselves pursuant to an Act intituled "An Act to prevent the further growth of Popery."	The whole act.
33 Geo. 2. c. 6 (I)	N/A	An Act for licensing Hawkers and Pedlars, and for encouragement of English Protestant Schools.	The whole act.
33 Geo. 2. c. 7 (I)	N/A	An Act for the more equal assessing and better collecting of Publick Money in Counties of Cities and Counties of Towns.	The whole act.
33 Geo. 2. c. 9 (I)	N/A	An Act to prevent the mixing or adulterating of Strong Waters and other Spirituous Liquors.	The whole act.
33 Geo. 2. c. 10 (I)	N/A	An Act for better regulating the Collection of His Majesty's Revenue,—continued thereby.	The whole act.
33 Geo. 2. c. 11 (I)	N/A	An Act for reviving and amending an Act passed in the Twenty-third Year of His present Majesty's Reign,—building of new Churches.	Section Four.
33 Geo. 2. c. 12 (I)	N/A	An Act for amending an Act intituled "An Act for the better supplying the City of Dublin with Corn and Flour."	The whole act.
33 Geo. 2. c. 14 (I)	Bankers' Act 1759	An Act for repealing an Act passed in this Kingdom in the Eighth Year of the Reign of King George the First, intituled "An Act for the better securing the payment of Bankers Notes, and for providing a more effectual Remedy for the Security and Payment of Debts due by Bankers."	Sections One, Two to the words "Banker or Bankers and," Seven, Thirteen, and Seventeen.
33 Geo. 2. c. 16 (I)	N/A	An Act for the better regulating the Corporation of the City of Dublin, and for extending the Power of the Magistrates thereof, and for other purposes relative to the said City.	Sections One to Fourteen. Section Sixteen to "sixty; and". Section Seventeen. Sections Eighteen to Twenty-two.
33 Geo. 2. c. 17 (I)	Insolvent Debtors Relief Act 1759	An Act for the Relief of Insolvent Debtors.	The whole act.
33 Geo. 2. c. 18 (I)	N/A	An Act for the more effectual enlightening of the City of Dublin and the Liberties thereof; and for the erecting of Publick Lights in the other Cities, Towns Corporate, and Market Towns in this Kingdom.	Sections Twenty-seven to Thirty-seven.
1 Geo. 3. c. 1 (I)	N/A	An Act for granting and continuing to His Majesty an additional Duty on Beer,—Great Britain.	The whole act.
1 Geo. 3. c. 2 (I)	N/A	An Act for granting to His Majesty a further additional Duty on Wine,—together with the Interest thereof.	The whole act.
1 Geo. 3. c. 3 (I)	N/A	An Act to perpetuate with Amendments a Clause in an Act passed in the Ninth Year of His late Majesty King George the Second, intituled "An Act for the more effectual assigning of Judgments, and for the more speedy recovery of Rents by Distress."	The whole act.
1 Geo. 3. c. 4 (I)	N/A	An Act for allowing further Time to Persons in Offices or Employments to qualify themselves pursuant to an Act intituled "An Act to prevent the further growth of Popery."	The whole act.
1 Geo. 3. c. 5 (I)	N/A	An Act for granting to His Majesty the several Duties, Rates, and Impositions therein expressed, to be applied to pay an Interest at the Rate of Five Pounds per Centum per Annum for the several Sums therein provided for, and towards the discharge of the said Principal Sums.	The whole act.
1 Geo. 3. c. 6 (I)	N/A	An Act for licensing Hawkers and Pedlars, and for encouragement of English Protestant Schools.	The whole act.
1 Geo. 3. c. 7 (I)	N/A	An Act for continuing and amending an Act intituled An Act for better regulating the Collection of His Majesty's Revenue,—continued thereby.	The whole act.
1 Geo. 3. c. 9 (I)	Gold and Silver Thread Act 1761	An Act to prevent the counterfeiting Gold and Silver Lace, and for settling and adjusting the Proportions of fine Gold, Silver, and Silk, and for the better making of Gold and Silver Thread.	Section Seven. Section Eight so far as it relates to the appropriation of penalties, and from "wherein no essoign", to the end of the Section. Section Eleven.
1 Geo. 3. c. 11 (I)	N/A	An Act to prevent Abuses committed by Justices of Peace acting under the Charters of Cities and Towns Corporate.	The whole act.
1 Geo. 3. c. 12 (I)	N/A	An Act for the security of Protestant Purchasers.	The whole act.
1 Geo. 3. c. 13 (I)	N/A	An Act for quieting the Possessions of Protestants deriving under Converts from the Popish Religion.	The whole act.
1 Geo. 3. c. 14 (I)	Royal College of Physicians Act 1761	An Act for preventing Frauds and Abuses in the vending, preparing, and administering Drugs and Medicines.	Section Twenty-three so far as it relates to the appropriation of penalties, and Section Twenty-five from "and that this present" to the end of the Section.
1 Geo. 3. c. 16 (I)	Insolvent Debtors Relief Act 1761	An Act for the Relief of Insolvent Debtors.	The whole act.
1 Geo. 3. c. 17 (I)	Municipal Corporations Act 1761	An Act for reviving, continuing, and amending several temporary Statutes, and for other purposes therein mentioned.	Sections One, Two, Six to Nine, Eleven to Eighteen, Twenty, Twenty-two to Twenty-four, and Twenty-eight.
3 Geo. 3. c. 1 (I)	N/A	An Act for granting and continuing to His Majesty an additional Duty on Beer,—Great Britain.	The whole act.
3 Geo. 3. c. 2	N/A	An Act for granting to His Majesty the several Duties, Rates, and Impositions therein expressed,—the said Principal Sums.	The whole act.
3 Geo. 3. c. 3	N/A	An Act for allowing further Time to Persons in Offices or Employments to qualify themselves pursuant to an Act intituled "An Act to prevent the further growth of Popery."	The whole act.
3 Geo. 3. c. 4	N/A	An Act for licensing Hawkers and Pedlars, and for encouragement of English Protestant Schools.	The whole act.
3 Geo. 3. c. 9	N/A	An Act for explaining an Act intituled "An Act for better supplying the City of Dublin with Corn and Flour;" and also an Act intituled "An Act for amending an Act intituled 'An Act for better supplying the City of Dublin with Corn and Flour.'"	The whole act.
3 Geo. 3. c. 11	N/A	An Act for altering and amending an Act intituled "An Act for amending an Act intituled 'An Act for encouragement of Tillage,'"—out of this Kingdom for England.	The whole act.
3 Geo. 3. c. 12	N/A	An Act for continuing the encouragement given by former Acts of Parliament to the Flaxen and Hempen Manufactures.	The whole act.
3 Geo. 3. c. 13	N/A	An Act for the more effectual preventing Bribery and Corruption in the Election of Members to serve in Parliament, and the Magistrates of Cities, Boroughs, and Towns Corporate.	The whole act.
3 Geo. 3. c. 14	Dublin Society Act 1763	An Act for directing the application of the Sum of Eight Thousand Pounds granted to the Dublin Society for the encouragement of such Trades and Manufactures as should be directed by Parliament.	The whole act.
3 Geo. 3. c. 16	Charities Act 1763	An Act for continuing and amending several temporary Statutes, and for other purposes therein mentioned.	Except Sections Fifteen and Seventeen.
3 Geo. 3. c. 19	Riot Act 1763	An Act for indemnifying all such Persons as have been or shall be aiding in the dispersing of Riots and apprehending the Rioters.	Section Two.
3 Geo. 3. c. 20	N/A	An Act for continuing several temporary Statutes.	The whole act.
3 Geo. 3. c. 21	N/A	An Act for continuing and amending two several Acts of Parliament therein mentioned, and for the more effectual preventing of Frauds in His Majesty's Customs and Excise, and for other purposes therein mentioned.	The whole act.
3 Geo. 3. c. 22	N/A	An Act for discharging all Arrears of Quit, Crown, and Composition Rents, which have been growing due for Twenty Years last past, on the Terms and in the Manner therein mentioned.	The whole act.
3 Geo. 3. c. 23	N/A	An Act for the better Preservation of the Game.	The whole act.
3 Geo. 3. c. 25	Tithes Act 1763	An Act to amend and explain an Act made in the Thirty-third Year of the Reign of Henry the Eight, intituled "An Act for Tithes, and for other Purposes therein mentioned."	The whole act.
3 Geo. 3. c. 26	N/A	An Act for confirming the Titles and for quieting the Possessions of Protestants, and for giving Time to Converts from Popery to perform the requisites of Conformity prescribed by the Laws against Popery.	The whole act.
3 Geo. 3. c. 28	Criminal Justice Act 1763	An Act for better preventing the Severities and unjust Exactions practised by Gaolers against their Prisoners, and for more effectually supporting Prosecutions at the Suit of the Crown in Cases of Felony and Treason.	Section Eighteen.
3 Geo. 3. c. 33	N/A	An Act to prevent Frauds in the tanning of Hides, in the currying of Leather, and the making of Shoes and Boots.	The whole act.
3 Geo. 3. c. 34	N/A	An Act for the better Regulation of the Linen and Hempen Manufactures.	Section One.
5 Geo. 3. c. 1 (I)	N/A	An Act for granting to His Majesty an additional Duty on Beer,—Great Britain.	The whole act.
5 Geo. 3. c. 2	N/A	An Act for granting to His Majesty the several Duties, Rates, and Impositions therein expressed,—the said Principal Sums.	The whole act.
5 Geo. 3. c. 3	N/A	An Act to prevent the distilling of Spirits from Wheat, Oats, Bear, Barley, Rye, Meslin, Malt, Beans, and Peas, and from any Potatoes, Meal, or Flour of Wheat, Oats, Bear, Barley, Rye, Meslin, Malt, Beans, or Peas, for a limited Time.	The whole act.
5 Geo. 3. c. 4	N/A	An Act to prevent the Exportation of Corn under certain Restrictions for a limited Time.	The whole act.
5 Geo. 3. c. 5	N/A	An Act for ascertaining the Duty of Excise payable upon the Importation of Brandy, Rum, and Geneva.	The whole act.
5 Geo. 3. c. 6	N/A	An Act for licensing Hawkers and Pedlars, and for encouragement of English Protestant Schools.	The whole act.
5 Geo. 3. c. 8	N/A	An Act to prevent for the future tumultuous risings of Persons within this Kingdom, and for other purposes therein mentioned.	The whole act.
5 Geo. 3. c. 11	N/A	An Act for allowing further Time to Persons in Offices or Employments to qualify themselves pursuant to an Act intituled "An Act to prevent the further growth of Popery."	The whole act.
5 Geo. 3. c. 12	N/A	An Act for directing the application of the Sum of Eight thousand Pounds granted to the Dublin Society for the encouragement of such Trades and Manufactures as should be directed by Parliament.	Except Section Seven.
5 Geo. 3. c. 14	N/A	An Act for more effectually amending the Public Roads.	Sections One and Seventeen.
5 Geo. 3. c. 15	N/A	An Act for continuing, reviving, and amending several temporary Statutes, and for empowering the Grand Jury of the County of Kilkenny at the Assizes to increase the yearly Salary of the Treasurer of said County.	The whole act.
5 Geo. 3. c. 16	N/A	An Act for continuing and amending several Laws relating to His Majesty's Revenue, and for more effectual preventing of Frauds therein, and for other purposes therein mentioned.	The whole act.
5 Geo. 3. c. 18	N/A	An Act for the better preservation of Corn.	The whole act.
5 Geo. 3. c. 19	N/A	An Act for the further encouragement of Tillage in this Kingdom.	The whole act.
5 Geo. 3. c. 20	County Hospitals Act 1765	An Act for erecting and establishing Publick Infirmaries or Hospitals in this Kingdom.	Section Four, as to the qualification of Surgeons; Sections Five, Twelve, and Fifteen, as to the application of the Moneys thereby granted; Sections Six and Eleven.
5 Geo. 3. c. 21	Treason Act (Ireland) 1765	An Act for the better regulating of Trials in Cases of High Treason under the Statute of the Twenty-fifth of Edward the Third.	Section One.
5 Geo. 3. c. 23	Insolvent Debtors Relief Act 1765	An Act for the Relief of Insolvent Debtors.	The whole act.
7 Geo. 3. c. 1 (I)	N/A	An Act for granting unto His Majesty an additional Duty on Beer.	The whole act.
7 Geo. 3. c. 2 (I)	N/A	An Act for granting to His Majesty the several Duties, Rates, Impositions, and Taxes.	The whole act.
7 Geo. 3. c. 3 (I)	Octennial Act 1767	An Act for limiting the Duration of Parliaments.	The whole act.
7 Geo. 3. c. 4 (I)	N/	An Act to enable Grand Juries to raise by presentment Money for discharging the Rents of Court-houses, Gaols, and Offices for keeping the Records of the respective Counties, and for other purposes.	Section One.
7 Geo. 3. c. 5 (I)	N/A	An Act to amend and explain an Act passed in the Sixth Year of His present Majesty's Reign intitled "An Act for the relief of Insolvent Debtors."	The whole act.
7 Geo. 3. c. 6 (I)	N/A	An Act to continue, amend, and make more effectual an Act passed in the Fourth Year of the Reign of His late Majesty King George the First.	The whole act.
7 Geo. 3. c. 8 (I)	N/A	An Act to amend an Act made the last Session of Parliament, for the erecting and establishing Publick Infirmaries or Hospitals in this Kingdom.	Section Three.
7 Geo. 3. c. 9 (I)	N/A	An Act for explaining and amending an Act passed in the Second Year of His Majesty King George the First entitled "An Act for the real Union and Division of Parishes, and for other purposes therein mentioned."	Section Two.
7 Geo. 3. c. 12 (I)	N/A	An Act to explain and amend the Laws made for the better supplying the City of Dublin with Corn and Flour.	The whole act.
7 Geo. 3. c. 14 (I)	N/A	An Act for the further explaining and amending an Act entitled "An Act to prevent the Disorders that may happen by the Marching of Soldiers; and for providing Carriages for the Baggage of Soldiers in their March."	The whole act.
7 Geo. 3. c. 15 (I)	Dublin Society Act 1767	An Act for directing the application of the Sum of Seven thousand Pounds granted to the Dublin Society for the encouragement of such Trades and Manufactures as should be directed by Parliament.	Except Sections Nine and Ten.
7 Geo. 3. c. 16 (I)	N/A	An Act for allowing further Time to Persons in Offices or Employments to qualify themselves pursuant to an Act intitled "An Act to prevent the further growth of Popery."	The whole act.
7 Geo. 3. c. 19 (I)	N/A	An Act for licensing Hawkers and Pedlars, and for encouragement of English Protestant Schools.	The whole act.
7 Geo. 3. c. 20 (I)	Timber Act 1767	An Act for continuing, reviving, and amending several temporary Statutes, and other purposes therein mentioned.	Except Section Eleven.
7 Geo. 3. c. 21 (I)	N/A	An Act to continue and amend an Act passed in the Third Year of His Majesty's Reign entitled "An Act to amend and explain an Act made in the Thirty-third Year of the Reign of Henry the Eighth entitled 'An Act for Tythes, and for other purposes therein mentioned.'"	The whole act.
7 Geo. 3. c. 24 (I)	N/A	An Act for the encouragement of Tillage and Navigation by granting a Bounty on the carriage of Corn coastways.	The whole act.
7 Geo. 3. c. 27 (I)	N/A	An Act for the further improvement of His Majesty's Revenue, and for continuing and amending several Acts therein particularly mentioned.	The whole act.
7 Geo. 3. c. 28 (I)	N/A	An Act to amend an Act made for the better preservation of Corn.	The whole act.
9 Geo. 3. c. 1 (I)	N/A	An Act for granting unto His Majesty an additional Duty on Beer.	The whole act.
9 Geo. 3. c. 2 (I)	N/A	An Act for granting to His Majesty the several Duties, Rates, Impositions, and Taxes.	The whole act.
11 Geo. 3. c. 1 (I)	N/A	An Act for reviving, continuing, and amending several temporary Statutes.	The whole act.
11 Geo. 3. c. 2	N/A	An Act for reviving, continuing, and amending several temporary Statutes, and for other purposes.	The whole act.
11 Geo. 3. c. 3	N/A	An Act for allowing further Time to Persons in Offices or Employments to qualify themselves pursuant to an Act intituled "An Act to prevent the further growth of Popery."	The whole act.
11 Geo. 3. c. 4	N/A	An Act for directing the application of the Sum of Twenty-eight thousand eight hundred Pounds granted the last Session of Parliament, to be applied to such Publick Works and other purposes as should be directed by Parliament.	The whole act.
11 Geo. 3. c. 5	N/A	An Act to prevent Combinations to raise the Price of Coals in the City of Dublin.	The whole act.
11 Geo. 3. c. 6	Burning of Bricks (Dublin) Act 1770	An Act to prevent the pernicious Practice of burning Bricks within the City of Dublin or the neighbourhood thereof.	Section Three, so far as it relates to the appropriation of penalties; Section Four.
11 Geo. 3. c. 7	Obstruction of Trade Act 1770	An Act for punishing such Persons as shall do Injuries and Violences to the Persone or Properties of His Majesty's Subjects, with Intent to hinder the Exportation of Corn.	Section Two, from "and if any" to the end of the Section; Section Three.
11 Geo. 3. c. 8	N/A	An Act to repeal an Act entitled "An Act for the Relief of Debtors, with respect to the Imprisonment of their Persons."	The whole act.
11 Geo. 3. c. 10	N/A	An Act to enable the Speaker of the House of Commons to issue his Warrants to make out new Writs for the choice of Members to serve in Parliament in the rooms of such Members as shall die during the recess of Parliament.	The whole act.
11 Geo. 3. c. 11	Quarantine Act 1770	An Act to oblige Ships more effectually to perform their Quarantine, and for the better preventing the Plague being brought from Foreign Parts into Ireland, and to hinder the Spreading of Infection.	The whole act.
11 Geo. 3. c. 13	N/A	An Act for continuing certain Laws heretofore made for the improvement of His Majesty's Revenue, and the more effectual prevention of Frauds therein.	The whole act.
11 & 12 Geo. 3. c. 1 (I)	N/A	An Act for granting unto His Majesty an additional Duty on the several Commodities.	The whole act.
11 & 12 Geo. 3. c. 2	N/A	An Act for granting to His Majesty the several Duties, Rates, Impositions, and Taxes.	The whole act.
11 & 12 Geo. 3. c. 3	N/A	An Act for licensing Hawkers and Pedlars, and for encouragement of English Protestant Schools.	The whole act.
11 & 12 Geo. 3. c. 4	N/A	An Act for granting and continuing to His Majesty the several Duties, Rates, and Impositions therein mentioned, for the use of the Corporation for promoting and carrying on an Inland Navigation in Ireland.	The whole act.
11 & 12 Geo. 3. c. 6	Customs Act 1771	An Act for amending and explaining a proviso or clause contained in an Act passed in the Fourteenth and Fifteenth Years of the Reign of King Charles the Second.	The whole act.
11 & 12 Geo. 3. c. 7	N/A	An Act for the further Improvement of His Majesty's Revenue, and the more effectual preventing of Frauds therein; and for continuing and amending several Laws heretofore made and now in force relative to His Majesty's said Revenue.	The whole act.
11 & 12 Geo. 3. c. 9	N/A	An Act for the better preventing of Frauds committed by persons claiming the Bounties for supplying the City of Dublin with Corn and Flour.	The whole act.
11 & 12 Geo. 3. c. 11	N/A	An Act for better regulating the Foundling Hospital and Workhouse in the City of Dublin.	Except Sections Sixty-five, Sixty-eight, Seventy-one, and Seventy-two.
11 & 12 Geo. 3. c. 12	Privilege of Parliament Act 1771	An Act for the further preventing Delays of Justice by reason of Privilege of Parliament.	The whole act.
11 & 12 Geo. 3. c. 14	N/A	An Act for preventing the spreading of Fires, and for appointing of Watches in Cities and Towns Corporate.	The whole act.
11 & 12 Geo. 3. c. 15	N/A	An Act for the Relief of poor Infants who are or shall be deserted by their Parents.	The whole act.
11 & 12 Geo. 3. c. 16	N/A	An Act for erecting Parochial Chapels of Ease in Parishes of large extent.	The whole act.
11 & 12 Geo. 3. c. 17	N/A	An Act for rendering more effectual the several Laws for the better enabling the Clergy having Cure of Souls to reside upon their Benefices.	Sections Twelve and Thirteen.
11 & 12 Geo. 3. c. 19	N/A	An Act for reviving and continuing several temporary Statutes that have lately expired, and for continuing others that are near expiring.	The whole act.
11 & 12 Geo. 3. c. 21	N/A	An Act to encourage the reclaiming of unprofitable bogs.	Section One.
11 & 12 Geo. 3. c. 22	N/A	An Act to prevent burying Dead Bodies in Churches.	The whole act.
11 & 12 Geo. 3. c. 26	Lagan Navigation Act 1771	An Act for amending an Act for the regulation of Partnerships to encourage the Trade and Manufacture of this Kingdom.	Section Five, from "shall not" to the end of the Section.
11 & 12 Geo. 3. c. 27	N/A	An Act for explaining and amending an Act made in the Eighth Year of the Reign of Her late Majesty Queen Anne.	The whole act.
11 & 12 Geo. 3. c. 29	N/A	An Act for allowing further Time to Persons in Offices or Employments to qualify themselves pursuant to an Act intitled "An Act to prevent the further growth of Popery."	The whole act.
11 & 12 Geo. 3. c. 30	N/A	An Act for badging such Poor as shall be found unable to support themselves by Labour, and otherwise providing for them, and for restraining such as shall be found able to support themselves by Labour or Industry from begging.	The whole act.
11 & 12 Geo. 3. c. 32	N/A	An Act for the Relief of several Insolvent Debtors named in the annexed Schedules.	The whole act.
11 & 12 Geo. 3. c. 33	N/A	An Act for regulating the Journeymen Taylors and Journeymen Shipwrights of the City of Dublin and the Liberties thereof and of the County of Dublin.	The whole act.
13 & 14 Geo. 3. c. 1 (I)	N/A	An Act for granting unto His Majesty an additional Duty on Beer.	The whole act.
13 & 14 Geo. 3. c. 2 (I)	N/A	An Act for granting unto His Majesty the several Duties, Rates, Impositions, and Taxes.	The whole act.
13 & 14 Geo. 3. c. 3 (I)	N/A	An Act for granting to His Majesty an additional Duty upon the several Goods and Merchandizes therein mentioned.	The whole act.
13 & 14 Geo. 3. c. 4 (I)	N/A	An Act to repeal an Act intitled "An Act for the more effectual punishing," certain Offenders therein mentioned.	The whole act.
13 & 14 Geo. 3. c. 5 (I)	Annuities Act 1773	An Act for granting Annuities in the manner therein provided to such Persons as shall voluntarily subscribe towards the raising a Sum not exceeding the Sum of Two hundred and sixty-five thousand Pounds.	The whole act.
13 & 14 Geo. 3. c. 6 (I)	N/A	An Act for granting to His Majesty, His Heirs and Successors, several Duties upon Vellum, Parchment, and Paper.	The whole act.
13 & 14 Geo. 3. c. 7 (I)	Annuities (No. 2) Act 1773	An Act to explain and amend an Act passed in this Session of Parliament entitled "An Act for granting Annuities in the Manner therein provided to such Persons as shall voluntarily subscribe towards the raising a Sum not exceeding the Sum of Two hundred and sixty-five thousand Pounds."	The whole act.
13 & 14 Geo. 3. c. 8 (I)	N/A	An Act for continuing and amending several Laws now in force relating to His Majesty's Revenue, and for the more effectual preventing Frauds therein.	The whole act.
13 & 14 Geo. 3. c. 9 (I)	N/A	An Act for licensing Hawkers and Pedlars, and for the encouragement of English Protestant Schools.	The whole act.
13 & 14 Geo. 3. c. 11 (I)	Tillage Act 1773	An Act for amending an Act passed in the Twenty-ninth Year of the Reign of His late Majesty King George the Second entitled "An Act for the further encouragement of Tillage."	The whole act.
13 & 14 Geo. 3. c. 13 (I)	N/A	An Act for allowing further Time to Persons in Offices or Employments to qualify themselves pursuant to an Act intitled "An Act to prevent the further growth of Popery."	The whole act.
13 & 14 Geo. 3. c. 17 (I)	N/A	An Act for granting to His Majesty, His Heirs and Successors, the yearly Sums therein mentioned, and for the better support of the Foundling Hospital and Workhouse of the City of Dublin, and for increasing the Fund thereof.	The whole act.
13 & 14 Geo. 3. c. 18 (I)	County Treasurers Act 1773	An Act for the better regulating the Office of County Treasurers, and the Duty of Clerks of the Crown in respect of Presentments.	The whole act.
13 & 14 Geo. 3. c. 19 (I)	N/A	An Act for the better and more certain Valuation of Houses in Counties of Cities and Counties of Towns.	The whole act.
13 & 14 Geo. 3. c. 20 (I)	N/A	An Act for amending the Laws relative to the lighting and cleansing of several Cities, and for establishing of Market Juries therein; and for other Purposes.	The whole act.
13 & 14 Geo. 3. c. 22 (I)	N/A	An Act for paving the Streets, Lanes, Quays, Bridges, Squares, Courts, and Alleys within the City and County of the City of Dublin, and other Purposes relative to the said City of Dublin, and other Places therein particularly mentioned.	Section Twenty-three.
13 & 14 Geo. 3. c. 23 (I)	N/A	An Act for the better regulation of the Admission and Practice of Attornies.	The whole act.
13 & 14 Geo. 3. c. 25 (I)	N/A	An Act for amending an Act passed in the Third Year of the Reign of His present Majesty intitled "An Act for confirming the Titles and for quieting the Possession of Protestants, and for giving Time to Converts from Popery to perform the Requisites of Conformity prescribed by the Laws against Popery."	The whole act.
13 & 14 Geo. 3. c. 26 (I)	N/A	An Act for enforcing a due Execution of the Laws relative to Turnpike Roads in this Kingdom.	The whole act.
13 & 14 Geo. 3. c. 32 (I)	N/A	An Act for amending the Publick Roads.	Section One.
13 & 14 Geo. 3. c. 37 (I)	N/A	An Act for preventing Frauds in the Measurement of Lime.	The whole act.
13 & 14 Geo. 3. c. 38 (I)	N/A	An Act to prevent the Importation of Wines in Casks under the Size of Thirty-one Gallons, except as herein excepted.	The whole act.
13 & 14 Geo. 3. c. 41 (I)	N/A	An Act for reviving and continuing several temporary Statutes, and to prevent the destructive Practice of trawling for Fish in the Bay of Dublin.	Sections Two to Eleven.
13 & 14 Geo. 3. c. 42 (I)	N/A	An Act for reviving, continuing, and amending several temporary Statutes, and for other Purposes therein mentioned.	Sections One to Five.
13 & 14 Geo. 3. c. 44 (I)	N/A	An Act to amend an Act passed the last Session of Parliament intitled "An Act for the Relief of the Insolvent Debtors named in the annexed Schedules."	The whole act.
13 & 14 Geo. 3. c. 46 (I)	N/A	An Act for amending an Act made the last Session of Parliament, entitled "An Act for badging such Poor."	Sections One to Eleven. Section Twenty-one.
15 & 16 Geo. 3. c. 1 (I)	N/A	An Act for granting unto His Majesty the several Duties, Rates, Impositions, and Taxes.	The whole act.
15 & 16 Geo. 3. c. 2	N/A	An Act for granting Annuities in the Manner therein provided to such Persons as shall voluntarily subscribe towards the raising a Sum not exceeding the Sum of One hundred and seventy-five thousand Pounds.	The whole act.
15 & 16 Geo. 3. c. 3	N/A	An Act for granting to His Majesty an additional Duty upon the several Goods and Merchandizes therein mentioned.	The whole act.
15 & 16 Geo. 3. c. 4	N/A	An Act to prevent Frauds in obtaining the Premiums for Flax Seed imported into this Kingdom.	The whole act.
15 & 16 Geo. 3. c. 5	N/A	An Act for allowing further Time to Persons in Offices or Employments to qualify themselves, pursuant to an Act entitled "An Act to prevent the further growth of Popery."	The whole act.
15 & 16 Geo. 3. c. 7	N/A	An Act to amend an Act passed in the Third Year of His present Majesty, entitled "An Act for continuing the Encouragement given by former Acts of Parliament to the Flaxen and Hempen Manufactures."	The whole act.
15 & 16 Geo. 3. c. 8	N/A	An Act for granting unto His Majesty an additional Duty on the several Commodities, Goods, and Merchandizes therein mentioned, and for prohibiting the Importation of all Gold and Silver Lace, and of all Cambricks and Lawns, except of the Manufacture of Great Britain.	The whole act.
15 & 16 Geo. 3. c. 9	N/A	An Act for granting unto His Majesty, His Heirs and Successors, several Duties upon Stamped Vellum, Parchment, and Paper.	The whole act.
15 & 16 Geo. 3. c. 10	N/A	An Act for explaining an Act entitled "An Act for granting unto His Majesty an additional Duty on the several Commodities."	The whole act.
15 & 16 Geo. 3. c. 11	N/A	An Act to explain and amend an Act made in the Eleventh Year of the Reign of His present Majesty entitled "An Act to enable the Speaker of the House of Commons."	The whole act.
15 & 16 Geo. 3. c. 14	N/A	An Act for repealing an Act made in the Thirteenth and Fourteenth Years of the Reign of His present Majesty entitled "An Act to explain and amend an Act made in the Third Year."	The whole act.
15 & 16 Geo. 3. c. 15	N/A	An Act for the improvement of His Majesty's Revenue, and the more effectual preventing of Frauds therein; and for continuing and amending several Laws heretofore made and now in force relative to His Majesty's said Revenue.	The whole act.
15 & 16 Geo. 3. c. 18	N/A	An Act for licensing Hawkers and Pedlars, and for the encouragement of English Protestant Schools.	The whole act.
15 & 16 Geo. 3. c. 19	N/A	An Act for the Improvement of the Fisheries of this Kingdom.	The whole act.
15 & 16 Geo. 3. c. 23	N/A	An Act for the Relief of the Out-Pensioners of the Hospital of King Charles the Second for Antient and Maimed Officers and Soldiers of the Army of Ireland.	The whole act.
15 & 16 Geo. 3. c. 25	Dublin Foundling Hospital Act 1775	An Act for amending an Act passed in the Eleventh and Twelfth Years of His present Majesty's Reign entitled "An Act for better Regulating the Foundling Hospital and Workhouse in the City of Dublin."	The whole act.
15 & 16 Geo. 3. c. 26	Timber Act 1775	An Act for encouraging the Cultivation and for the better Preservation of Trees, Shrubs, Plants, and Roots.	Section One.
15 & 16 Geo. 3. c. 29	N/A	An Act for regulating of Trials of Peers or Peeresses in Cases of Capital Offences.	The whole act.
15 & 16 Geo. 3. c. 30	N/A	An Act for continuing an Act entitled "An Act for the further preventing Delays of Justice by reason of Privilege of Parliament."	The whole act.
15 & 16 Geo. 3. c. 32	N/A	An Act for reviving, amending, and continuing several temporary Statutes, and for other Purposes therein mentioned.	The whole act.
15 & 16 Geo. 3. c. 34	N/A	An Act to prohibit the burning of Lime or Limestones in any Limekiln which had not been erected before the Twenty-fourth day of March One thousand seven hundred and seventy-two.	The whole act.
15 & 16 Geo. 3. c. 35	N/A	An Act for amending an Act made in the Eleventh and Twelfth Years of His present Majesty's Reign entitled "An Act for badging such Poor."	The whole act.
16 Geo. 3. c. 1 (I)	N/A	An Act for continuing an Act intituled "An Act for allowing further Time to Persons in Offices or Employments to qualify themselves pursuant to an Act intituled 'An Act to prevent the further growth of Popery.'"	The whole act.
17 & 18 Geo. 3. c. 1 (I)	N/A	An Act for granting unto His Majesty an additional Duty on Beer.	The whole act.
17 & 18 Geo. 3. c. 2 (I)	N/A	An Act for granting unto His Majesty the several Duties, Rates, Impositions, and Taxes.	The whole act.
17 & 18 Geo. 3. c. 3 (I)	N/A	An Act for granting to His Majesty, His Heirs and Successors, several Duties upon Stamped Vellum, Parchment, and Paper.	The whole act.
17 & 18 Geo. 3. c. 4 (I)	N/A	An Act for granting to His Majesty an additional Duty upon the several Goods and Merchandizes therein mentioned.	The whole act.
17 & 18 Geo. 3. c. 5 (I)	N/A	An Act for allowing further Time to Persons in Offices or Employments to qualify themselves pursuant to an Act intitled "An Act to prevent the further growth of Popery."	The whole act.
17 & 18 Geo. 3. c. 6 (I)	N/A	An Act for licensing Hawkers and Pedlars, and for the encouragement of English Protestant Schools.	The whole act.
17 & 18 Geo. 3. c. 7 (I)	N/A	An Act to continue an Act entitled "An Act to amend an Act passed in the Third Year of His present Majesty entitled 'An Act for continuing the Encouragement given by former Acts of Parliament to the Flaxen and Hempen Manufactures.'"	The whole act.
17 & 18 Geo. 3. c. 8 (I)	N/A	An Act for the improvement of His Majesty's Revenue and the more effectually preventing of Frauds therein; and for continuing and amending several Laws heretofore made and now in force relative thereto.	The whole act.
17 & 18 Geo. 3. c. 9 (I)	N/A	An Act to authorize for a limited Time the Punishment by Hard Labour of Offenders who for certain Crimes are or shall become liable to be transported to any of His Majesty's Colonies and Plantations.	The whole act.
17 & 18 Geo. 3. c. 11 (I)	N/A	An Act for continuing and amending an Act passed in the Fourteenth Year of His present Majesty's Reign entitled "An Act to prevent Malicious Cutting and Wounding, and to punish Offenders called Chalkers."	The whole act.
17 & 18 Geo. 3. c. 13 (I)	Militia Act 1777	An Act for establishing a Militia in this Kingdom.	The whole act.
17 & 18 Geo. 3. c. 14 (I)	Insolvent Debtors Relief Act 1777	An Act for the Relief of Insolvent Debtors.	The whole act.
17 & 18 Geo. 3. c. 16 (I)	N/A	An Act for granting and continuing to His Majesty the several Duties, Rates, and Impositions therein mentioned, for the use of the Corporation for Promoting and Carrying on an Inland Navigation in Ireland.	The whole act.
17 & 18 Geo. 3. c. 18 (I)	N/A	An Act for the further Encouragement of the Whale Fisheries carried on from Ireland.	The whole act.
17 & 18 Geo. 3. c. 21 (I)	N/A	An Act to explain and amend an Act passed in the Third Year of the Reign of His present Majesty entitled "An Act for the better Regulation of the Linen and Hempen Manufactures."	Sections One and Eight.
17 & 18 Geo. 3. c. 23 (I)	N/A	An Act to amend an Act entitled "An Act for enforcing a due Execution of the Laws relative to Turnpike Roads in this Kingdom."	The whole act.
17 & 18 Geo. 3. c. 24 (I)	N/A	An Act to prevent the Mischiefs that arise from driving Cattle within the City of Dublin and Liberties thereof.	The whole act.
17 & 18 Geo. 3. c. 25 (I)	N/A	An Act to explain the Statute of the Twenty-eighth Year of Henry the Eighth entitled "The Act of Faculties."	The whole act.
17 & 18 Geo. 3. c. 27 (I)	N/A	An Act to direct the Application of the Sum of Five thousand Pounds granted this Session to the Commissioners appointed by Act of Parliament for making wide and convenient Passages through the City of Dublin, and for the further Improvement thereof.	The whole act.
17 & 18 Geo. 3. c. 29 (I)	N/A	An Act for explaining a Doubt arising upon the Laws for supplying the City of Dublin with Corn and Flour; and also for lessening the Expenses of supplying the said City with the Articles aforesaid.	The whole act.
17 & 18 Geo. 3. c. 30 (I)	Quarantine Act 1777	An Act to continue an Act passed in the Eleventh Year of His present Majesty's Reign entitled "An Act to oblige Ships more effectually to perform their Quarantine, and for the better preventing the Plague being brought from Foreign Parts into Ireland, and to hinder the spreading of Infection."	The whole act.
17 & 18 Geo. 3. c. 31 (I)	Tillage Act 1777	An Act for continuing an Act entitled "An Act for amending an Act passed in the Twenty-ninth Year of the Reign of His late Majesty King George the Second entitled 'An Act for the further encouragement of Tillage.'"	The whole act.
17 & 18 Geo. 3. c. 32 (I)	N/A	An Act for regulating the Price and Assize of Bread, and preventing Frauds and Impositions in the Sale of Flour, Meal, Beer, Ale, Potatoes, Butcher's Meat, and other Articles sold by Weight or Measure in the County of Dublin.	The whole act.
17 & 18 Geo. 3. c. 34 (I)	N/A	An Act for the encouragement of Tillage, and rendering the carriage of Corn to the City of Dublin less expensive.	The whole act.
17 & 18 Geo. 3. c. 36 (I)	Tumultuous Risings (Extension) Act 1777	An Act for reviving and continuing several temporary Statutes.	Except Section Eight to "within this Kingdom."
17 & 18 Geo. 3. c. 41 (I)	N/A	An Act for granting unto His Majesty, His Heirs and Successors, certain Duties therein contained, and for the further advancement of the Trade of this Kingdom.	The whole act.
17 & 18 Geo. 3. c. 42 (I)	N/A	An Act for the advancement of the Trade of this Kingdom.	The whole act.
17 & 18 Geo. 3. c. 45 (I)	Outlawries Act 1777	An Act for the amendment of the Law with respect to Outlawries, returning Special Juries, and the future Effects of Bankrupts in certain Cases.	Sections Three to Ten.
17 & 18 Geo. 3. c. 49 (I)	Leases for Lives Act 1777	An Act for the Relief of His Majesty's Subjects of this Kingdom professing the Popish Religion.	Except Section Eleven.
19 & 20 Geo. 3. c. 1 (I)	N/A	An Act for granting unto His Majesty an additional Duty on Beer.	The whole act.
19 & 20 Geo. 3. c. 2	N/A	An Act for granting unto His Majesty the several Duties, Rates, Impositions, and Taxes.	The whole act.
19 & 20 Geo. 3. c. 3	N/A	An Act for granting to His Majesty, His Heirs and Successors, several Duties upon Stamped Vellum, Parchment, and Paper.	The whole act.
19 & 20 Geo. 3. c. 4	N/A	An Act for the advancement of the Trade of this Kingdom.	The whole act.
19 & 20 Geo. 3. c. 5	Lottery Act 1779	An Act for establishing a Lottery, and for granting to His Majesty a Sum of Two hundred thousand Pounds to be raised thereby, and for such other Purposes as are therein mentioned.	Sections One to Twenty-eight, Forty-three from "in which no essoign" to the end of the Section, Forty-five, and Forty-seven.
19 & 20 Geo. 3. c. 6	N/A	An Act for the Relief of His Majesty's faithful Subjects the Protestant Dissenters of this Kingdom, and to repeal a Clause in the Act of the second of Queen Ann intitled "An Act to prevent the further growth of Popery, as far as the same relates to the Protestant Dissenters."	The whole act.
19 & 20 Geo. 3. c. 7	N/A	An Act for granting unto His Majesty an additional Duty on Beer.	The whole act.
19 & 20 Geo. 3. c. 8	N/A	An Act for granting to His Majesty, His Heirs and Successors, several Duties upon Stamped Vellum, Parchment, and Paper.	The whole act.
19 & 20 Geo. 3. c. 9	N/A	An Act for licensing Hawkers and Pedlars, and for the Encouragement of English Protestant Schools.	The whole act.
19 & 20 Geo. 3. c. 10	N/A	An Act for granting unto His Majesty the several Duties, Rates, Impositions, and Taxes.	The whole act.
19 & 20 Geo. 3. c. 11	N/A	An Act for the advancement of Trade, and for granting to His Majesty, His Heirs and Successors, the several Duties therein mentioned.	The whole act.
19 & 20 Geo. 3. c. 12	N/A	An Act for continuing and amending several Laws relating to His Majesty's Revenue, and for the more effectually preventing of Frauds therein, and for such other Purposes as are therein mentioned.	The whole act.
19 & 20 Geo. 3. c. 14	N/A	An Act for reviving, continuing, and amending several temporary Statutes.	The whole act.
19 & 20 Geo. 3. c. 15	N/A	An Act for continuing several temporary Statutes, and for amending an Act passed in the Eleventh and Twelfth Years of the Reign of His present Majesty.	Sections One to Three.
19 & 20 Geo. 3. c. 16	N/A	An Act for the better Accommodation and Regulation of His Majesty's Army in this Kingdom.	The whole act.
19 & 20 Geo. 3. c. 17	Corn Trade Act 1779	An Act for the better regulating the Corn Trade of this Kingdom.	The whole act.
19 & 20 Geo. 3. c. 19	Obstruction of Trade Act 1779	An Act to prevent Combinations, and for the further encouragement of Trade.	Except Sections Fifteen to Seventeen; and Sections Six to Ten so far as they relate to the County of the City of Dublin.
19 & 20 Geo. 3. c. 22	N/A	An Act to amend a Mistake in an Act passed in the Thirteenth and Fourteenth Years of His present Majesty entitled "An Act for amending the Public Roads."	The whole act.
19 & 20 Geo. 3. c. 23	N/A	An Act for regulating and extending the Tobacco Trade.	The whole act.
19 & 20 Geo. 3. c. 28	N/A	An Act for the Relief of Persons who have omitted to qualify themselves according to Law.	The whole act.
19 & 20 Geo. 3. c. 30	Tenantry Act 1779	An Act for the Relief of Tenants holding under Leases for Lives containing Covenants for Perpetual Renewals.	Section Three.
19 & 20 Geo. 3. c. 31	N/A	An Act for licensing and regulating Lottery Offices, and for other Purposes therein mentioned.	Section Twenty-two.
19 & 20 Geo. 3. c. 33	N/A	An Act for granting Bounties on the export of certain Species of the Linen and Hempen Manufactures of this Kingdom therein enumerated, and for repealing the Bounties on Flax Seed imported, and for encouraging the growth thereof in this Kingdom.	The whole act.
19 & 20 Geo. 3. c. 34	Tillage Act 1779	An Act to continue and amend an Act passed in the Seventeenth and Eighteenth Years of the Reign of His present Majesty, intitled "An Act for the encouragement of Tillage, and rendering the carriage of Corn to the City of Dublin less expensive."	The whole act.
19 & 20 Geo. 3. c. 35	N/A	An Act for regulating the Sugar Trade, and granting to His Majesty, His Heirs and Successors, the Duties therein mentioned.	The whole act.
19 & 20 Geo. 3. c. 36	N/A	An Act for regulating the curing and preparing Provisions.	The whole act.
19 & 20 Geo. 3. c. 37	N/A	An Act to prevent the detestable Practices of houghing Cattle, burning of Houses, Barns, Haggards, and Corn, and for other Purposes.	The whole act.
19 & 20 Geo. 3. c. 38	N/A	An Act to prevent vexatious and frivolous Arrests, and for other Purposes.	Sections Two, Four, and Five, so far as it relates to execution against the Person or detention of the Person.
19 & 20 Geo. 3. c. 39	N/A	An Act for explaining an Act made in the Eighth Year of the Reign of Her late Majesty Queen Anne.	The whole act.
19 & 20 Geo. 3. c. 40	N/A	An Act for the Relief of Persons in actual custody for Debt.	The whole act.
19 & 20 Geo. 3. c. 41	Bridges Act 1779	An Act for empowering Grand Juries to present Bridges and Tolls to be paid for passing the same in certain Cases.	The whole act.
19 & 20 Geo. 3. c. 50	N/A	An Act for further enforcing a due Execution of the Laws relative to Turnpike Roads in this Kingdom.	The whole act.
21 & 22 Geo. 3. c. 1 (I)	N/A	An Act for granting to His Majesty an additional Duty on Beer.	The whole act.
21 & 22 Geo. 3. c. 2	N/A	An Act for granting unto His Majesty the several Aids, Duties, Rates, Impositions, and Taxes.	The whole act.
21 & 22 Geo. 3. c. 3	N/A	An Act for granting to His Majesty, His Heirs and Successors, several Duties upon Stamped Vellum, Parchment, and Paper.	The whole act.
21 & 22 Geo. 3. c. 4	N/A	An Act for regulating and extending the Tobacco Trade, and for granting to His Majesty, His Heirs and Successors, the Duties therein mentioned.	The whole act.
21 & 22 Geo. 3. c. 5	N/A	An Act for the advancement of Trade, and for granting to His Majesty, His Heirs and Successors, the several Duties therein mentioned.	The whole act.
21 & 22 Geo. 3. c. 6	N/A	An Act for regulating the Sugar Trade, and for granting to His Majesty, His Heirs and Successors, the Duties therein mentioned.	The whole act.
21 & 22 Geo. 3. c. 7	N/A	An Act for allowing further Time to Persons in Offices or Employments to qualify themselves pursuant to an Act, intituled "An Act to prevent the further growth of Popery."	The whole act.
21 & 22 Geo. 3. c. 8	N/A	An Act to promote the Linen and Hempen Manufacture by encreasing the Supply of Irish Flax-seed, and encouraging the export of Linens and Sailcloth, and for other Purposes therein mentioned.	The whole act.
21 & 22 Geo. 3. c. 9	N/A	An Act for regulating Drawbacks and Bounties, preventing export of Manufacturing Utensils except to Great Britain, for encouraging the import of Organized Silk and of other Goods from Places therein named.	The whole act.
21 & 22 Geo. 3. c. 11	Habeas Corpus Act 1781	An Act for better securing the Liberty of the Subject.	Section Fourteen.
21 & 22 Geo. 3. c. 14	N/A	An Act for licensing Hawkers and Pedlars, and for the encouragement of English Protestant Schools, and for such other Purposes as are therein mentioned.	The whole act.
21 & 22 Geo. 3. c. 15	N/A	An Act for continuing and amending several Laws relating to His Majesty's Revenue, and for the more effectually preventing of Frauds therein, and for such other Purposes as are therein mentioned.	The whole act.
21 & 22 Geo. 3. c. 17	N/A	An Act for the Improvement of the City of Dublin by making wide and convenient Passages through the same, and for regulating the Coal Trade thereof.	The whole act.
21 & 22 Geo. 3. c. 18	Trials at Nisi Prius Act 1781	An Act for enlarging the Time for Trials by Nisi Prius in the City of Dublin and County of Dublin, and for making the Process of the Court of Exchequer more effectual against Persons who, being served therewith, refuse to appear.	The whole act.
21 & 22 Geo. 3. c. 20	State Debts Act 1781	An Act for the more speedy and effectual Recovery of the King's Debts.	Section Twenty-five.
21 & 22 Geo. 3. c. 21	N/A	An Act for the more effectually preventing the multiplying Votes at Elections of Members to serve in Parliament for Boroughs, where a Right of Voting is vested in the Protestant Inhabitants in general or Protestant Inhabitants and others.	The whole act.
21 & 22 Geo. 3. c. 22	Dublin Butter Trade Act 1781	An Act to explain and amend an Act made in the Nineteenth and Twentieth Years of His present Majesty.	The whole act.
21 & 22 Geo. 3. c. 24	Roman Catholic Relief Act 1782	An Act for the further Relief of His Majesty's Subjects of this Kingdom professing the Popish Religion.	Sections Twelve to Fourteen.
21 & 22 Geo. 3. c. 25	N/A	An Act for the Relief of Protestant Dissenters in certain Matters therein contained.	The whole act.
21 & 22 Geo. 3. c. 28	N/A	An Act to amend the Laws for the erecting and regulating Free Schools.	The whole act.
21 & 22 Geo. 3. c. 30	N/A	An Act to remove certain Doubts which have been conceived concerning the Construction of Three several Acts of Parliament passed in this Kingdom in the Reign of His present Majesty for granting Annuities to such Persons as should voluntarily subscribe the Sums therein respectively mentioned.	The whole act.
21 & 22 Geo. 3. c. 31	N/A	An Act to enable the Clergy to issue Process or Execution for Debts due for Tithes or Dues under Five Pounds.	The whole act.
21 & 22 Geo. 3. c. 33	N/A	An Act to regulate the Qualification of Persons appointed to Offices in this Kingdom wherein Two or more Grantees act under One Grant, Commission, or Appointment.	The whole act.
21 & 22 Geo. 3. c. 34	N/A	An Act for the Relief of Sheriffs from whom Prisoners in Execution for Debt shall be rescued in their Removal by virtue of Writs of Habeas Corpus in such Cases where the said Sheriffs shall appear to have been guilty of no Neglect or Default.	The whole act.
21 & 22 Geo. 3. c. 35	N/A	An Act for prohibiting the use of Lime in bleaching, regulating Seal Masters of Linens, encouraging the Home Manufacture of Ashes for Bleachers' use, enlarging and rendering more commodious the Linen Hall in the City of Dublin, and other Purposes therein mentioned.	Section Fifty-four to "null and void."
21 & 22 Geo. 3. c. 36	N/A	An Act for the better regulating the Corn Trade of this Kingdom.	The whole act.
21 & 22 Geo. 3. c. 37	N/A	An Act to explain and amend the Acts for the encouragement of the Fisheries of this Kingdom, and for Promoting the Good Ends proposed by said Laws.	The whole act.
21 & 22 Geo. 3. c. 40	N/A	An Act for reviving, continuing, and amending several temporary Statutes.	Sections One to Seventeen, and Twenty to Twenty-six.
21 & 22 Geo. 3. c. 41	N/A	An Act for discharging all Prisoners now confined in the several Gaols of this Kingdom for Fees only.	The whole act.
21 & 22 Geo. 3. c. 42	N/A	An Act for enforcing the due Execution of the Highways Law in being.	Sections Five and Six.
21 & 22 Geo. 3. c. 43	N/A	An Act for punishing Mutiny and Desertion, and for the better Payment of the Army and their Quarters; as also for the repeal of an Act intituled "An Act for the better Accommodation and Regulation of His Majesty's Army in this Kingdom."	The whole act.
21 & 22 Geo. 3. c. 44	N/A	An Act for the Regulation of His Majesty's Marine Forces while on Shore.	The whole act.
21 & 22 Geo. 3. c. 45	N/A	An Act to explain and amend an Act passed in the Eleventh and Twelfth Years of His present Majesty.	The whole act.
21 & 22 Geo. 3. c. 47	N/A	An Act to prevent the Manner of passing Bills, and to prevent Delays in summoning of Parliaments.	The whole act.
21 & 22 Geo. 3. c. 48	Calendar Act 1781	An Act for extending certain of the Provisions contained in an Act intituled "An Act confirming all the Statutes made in England."	Section Three from "and also all such clauses" to "omitting the same."
21 & 22 Geo. 3. c. 49	N/A	An Act for redress of erroneous Judgments, Orders, and Decrees.	The whole act.
21 & 22 Geo. 3. c. 54	N/A	An Act to prohibit the ransoming of Ships or Vessels captured from His Majesty's Subjects of this Kingdom, and of the Merchandize or Goods on board such Ships or Vessels.	The whole act.
21 & 22 Geo. 3. c. 55	N/A	An Act to allow the Importation of Goods of the growth, produce, or manufacture of Saint Christophers, Nevis, and Montserrat.	The whole act.
21 & 22 Geo. 3. c. 56	N/A	An Act to permit the Importation of British Plantation Tobacco from any Port or Place, either in America or the West Indies or in Europe, during the present Hostilities.	The whole act.
21 & 22 Geo. 3. c. 58	N/A	An Act for sparing to His Majesty, to be drawn out of this Kingdom whenever His Majesty shall think fit, a Force not exceeding Five thousand Men, part of the Troops appointed to remain in this Kingdom for its defence.	The whole act.
21 & 22 Geo. 3. c. 59	N/A	An Act for the Relief of Insolvent Persons under a certain Description.	The whole act.
21 & 22 Geo. 3. c. 61	N/A	An Act to explain and amend an Act intituled "An Act to prevent vexatious and frivolous Arrests, and for other Purposes."	The whole act.
21 & 22 Geo. 3. c. 62	N/A	An Act to allow Persons professing the Popish Religion to teach School in this Kingdom, and for regulating the Education of Papists, and also to repeal Parts of certain Laws relative to the guardianship of their Children.	The whole act.
23 & 24 Geo. 3. c. 1 (I)	N/A	An Act for granting unto His Majesty, His Heirs and Successors, an additional Duty on Wine.	The whole act.
23 & 24 Geo. 3. c. 2 (I)	N/A	An Act for granting to His Majesty the several Aids, Duties, Rates, Impositions, and Taxes.	The whole act.
23 & 24 Geo. 3. c. 3 (I)	N/A	An Act for granting to His Majesty, His Heirs and Successors, several Duties upon Stamped Vellum, Parchment, and Paper.	The whole act.
23 & 24 Geo. 3. c. 4 (I)	N/A	An Act for regulating the Sugar Trade, and for granting to His Majesty, His Heirs and Successors, the Duties therein mentioned.	The whole act.
23 & 24 Geo. 3. c. 5 (I)	N/A	An Act for the advancement of Trade, and for granting to His Majesty, His Heirs and Successors, the several Duties therein mentioned.	The whole act.
23 & 24 Geo. 3. c. 6 (I)	N/A	An Act for regulating and extending the Tobacco Trade, and for granting to His Majesty, His Heirs and Successors, the Duties therein mentioned.	The whole act.
23 & 24 Geo. 3. c. 7 (I)	N/A	An Act to promote the Linen and Hempen Manufacture by encreasing the Supply of Irish Flax Seed, and encouraging the export of Linens and Sail Cloth, and for other Purposes therein mentioned.	The whole act.
23 & 24 Geo. 3. c. 8 (I)	N/A	An Act for punishing Mutiny and Desertion, and for the better Payment of the Army and their Quarters, within this Kingdom.	The whole act.
23 & 24 Geo. 3. c. 9 (I)	Trade with United States Act 1783	An Act for facilitating the Trade and Intercourse between this Kingdom and the United States of America.	The whole act.
23 & 24 Geo. 3. c. 10 (I)	N/A	An Act for indemnifying such Persons as have acted for the Service of the Publick in advising or carrying into Execution a Proclamation.	The whole act.
23 & 24 Geo. 3. c. 12 (I)	Prosperous Markets Act 1783	An Act for the issuing Treasury Bills to the Amount therein mentioned for the purpose of promoting Manufactures by providing for the Settlement of a Number of Industrious Manufacturers at Prosperous, in the County of Kildare.	Except Sections Eight and Nine.
23 & 24 Geo. 3. c. 16 (I)	N/A	An Act for Relief of Persons who have omitted to qualify themselves according to Law.	The whole act.
23 & 24 Geo. 3. c. 18 (I)	N/A	An Act for granting to His Majesty, His Heirs and Successors, a further additional Duty on imported Hops, and other Duties therein mentioned.	The whole act.
23 & 24 Geo. 3. c. 19 (I)	N/A	An Act for regulating the Corn Trade, promoting Agriculture, and providing a regular and steady Supply of Corn in this Kingdom, and for granting to His Majesty, His Heirs and Successors, the Duties therein mentioned.	The whole act.
23 & 24 Geo. 3. c. 20 (I)	Obstruction of Trade Act 1783	An Act for the more effectually Punishing such Persons as shall by Violence obstruct the Freedom of Corn Markets and the Corn Trade; or who shall be guilty of other Offences therein mentioned, and for making Satisfaction to the Parties injured.	Section Thirteen.
23 & 24 Geo. 3. c. 21 (I)	N/A	An Act for Licensing Hawkers and Pedlars, and for the encouragement of English Protestant Schools.	The whole act.
23 & 24 Geo. 3. c. 22 (I)	Funds in Chancery Act 1783	An Act for better securing the Monies and Effects of the Suitors of the Court of Chancery.	Section One to "imposed by Act of Parliament." Sections Five, Six, Eight, Eleven to Sixteen; Section Seventeen, the words "and Court of Exchequer, or either of them"; Sections Eighteen and Nineteen; Section Twenty, the words "and Court of Exchequer" occurring twice.
23 & 24 Geo. 3. c. 23 (I)	Plate Assay Act 1783	An Act to regulate the Assay of Gold, and promote the manufacture of Gold and Silver Wares in this Kingdom.	Sections One, Two, Thirty-one, Thirty-four, Thirty-eight to Forty. Section Forty-one from "wherein no essoign" to "suing for the same." Section Forty-five.
23 & 24 Geo. 3. c. 25 (I)	N/A	An Act for regulating the Import of Cinnamon, Cloves, Mace, and Nutmegs, and for the better collecting the Duties thereon.	The whole act.
23 & 24 Geo. 3. c. 29 (I)	N/A	An Act for continuing and amending several Laws relating to His Majesty's Revenue, and for the more effectually preventing of Frauds therein.	The whole act.
23 & 24 Geo. 3. c. 32 (I)	Trade with United States (No. 2) Act 1783	An Act for continuing an Act entitled "An Act for facilitating the Trade and Intercourse between this Kingdom and the United States of America, and for furthering the said Trade and Intercourse."	The whole act.
23 & 24 Geo. 3. c. 33 (I)	N/A	An Act for directing the Application of the Sum of Fifteen thousand Pounds.	The whole act.
23 & 24 Geo. 3. c. 34 (I)	Prisoners' Fees Act 1783	An Act for the Relief of Prisoners charged with Felony or other Crimes who shall be acquitted or discharged by Proclamation respecting their Fees, and giving a Recompence for such Fees.	Except as to the County of the City of Dublin.
23 & 24 Geo. 3. c. 35 (I)	N/A	An Act to prevent the pernicious Practice of erecting Glass Houses within the City of Dublin or a certain Distance thereof.	The whole act.
23 & 24 Geo. 3. c. 36 (I)	N/A	An Act to continue an Act passed in the Eleventh and Twelfth Years of the Reign of His present Majesty entitled "An Act for the further preventing Delays of Justice by reason of Privilege of Parliament."	The whole act.
23 & 24 Geo. 3. c. 37 (I)	N/A	An Act for indemnifying such Person or Persons as have acted for the Service of the Public.	The whole act.
23 & 24 Geo. 3. c. 39 (I)	Timber Act 1783	An Act to amend the Laws for the encouragement of planting Timber Trees.	Section Twenty.
23 & 24 Geo. 3. c. 41 (I)	Prisons Act 1783	An Act for altering, amending, and rendering more effectual the Laws now in being for regulating and managing the publick Gaols and Prisons throughout this Kingdom.	Sections Sixteen, Seventeen, and Eighteen.
23 & 24 Geo. 3. c. 47 (I)	N/A	An Act for discharging certain Arrears of Quit, Crown, and Composition Rents which have been growing due for Twenty Years last past on the Terms and in the Manner therein mentioned.	The whole act.
23 & 24 Geo. 3. c. 49 (I)	Endowments of Parishes, Glebe Lands, etc. Act 1783	An Act for making appropriate Parishes belonging to Archbishops and Bishops Perpetual Cures.	Section Nine.
23 & 24 Geo. 3. c. 54 (I)	N/A	An Act for reviving and continuing temporary Statutes.	The whole act.
23 & 24 Geo. 3. c. 55 (I)	Pawnbrokers Act 1783	An Act to remove Doubts and Scruples with respect to the Construction of an Act passed in this Kingdom in the Fifth Year of His late Majesty King George the Second, entitled "An Act for reducing the Interest of Money to Six per Cent."	The whole act.
23 & 24 Geo. 3. c. 56 (I)	N/A	An Act for the more effectual Discovery and Prosecution of Offenders called Houghers, and for the Support and Maintenance of Soldiers or others houghed, maimed, and disabled by such Offenders.	The whole act.
23 & 24 Geo. 3. c. 58 (I)	N/A	An Act to explain an Act passed in the Eleventh and Twelfth Years of His present Majesty.	The whole act.
25 Geo. 3. c. 1 (I)	N/A	An Act for granting unto His Majesty, His Heirs and Successors, an additional Duty on Wine.	The whole act.
25 Geo. 3. c. 2 (I)	N/A	An Act for granting to His Majesty the several Aids, Duties, Rates, Impositions, and Taxes.	The whole act.
25 Geo. 3. c. 3 (I)	N/A	An Act for granting unto His Majesty, His Heirs and Successors, certain Duties upon Malt.	The whole act.
25 Geo. 3. c. 4 (I)	N/A	An Act for the Advancement of Trade, and for granting to His Majesty, His Heirs and Successors, the several Duties therein mentioned.	The whole act.
25 Geo. 3. c. 5 (I)	N/A	An Act for regulating the Sugar Trade, and for granting to His Majesty, His Heirs and Successors, the Duties therein mentioned.	The whole act.
25 Geo. 3. c. 6 (I)	N/A	An Act for regulating and extending the Tobacco Trade, and for granting to His Majesty, His Heirs and Successors, the Duties therein mentioned.	The whole act.
25 Geo. 3. c. 7 (I)	N/A	An Act for granting to His Majesty, His Heirs and Successors, the several Duties therein mentioned upon Coffee.	The whole act.
25 Geo. 3. c. 8 (I)	N/A	An Act for granting certain Duties upon Licenses, to be taken out by the several Persons therein mentioned.	The whole act.
25 Geo. 3. c. 9 (I)	N/A	An Act for granting unto His Majesty, His Heirs and Successors, certain Duties on Carriages.	The whole act.
25 Geo. 3. c. 10 (I)	N/A	An Act for explaining and amending an Act for regulating the Corn Trade, promoting Agriculture, and providing a regular and steady Supply of Corn in this Kingdom, and for granting to His Majesty, His Heirs and Successors, the Duties therein mentioned.	The whole act.
25 Geo. 3. c. 11 (I)	N/A	An Act to promote the Linen and Hempen Manufacture, by encreasing the Supply of Irish Flax Seed, and encouraging the export of Linens and Sail Cloth, and for granting to His Majesty, His Heirs and Successors, the Duties therein mentioned.	The whole act.
25 Geo. 3. c. 12 (I)	N/A	An Act for granting the Sum of Four thousand Pounds to the Persons and for the Purposes therein mentioned.	The whole act.
25 Geo. 3. c. 13 (I)	N/A	An Act for the better Encouragement of Trade, by regulating the payment of Bounties, and exempting them from Fees.	The whole act.
25 Geo. 3. c. 14 (I)	N/A	An Act for granting the Sum of Twenty thousand Pounds to the Speaker of the House of Commons.	The whole act.
25 Geo. 3. c. 15 (I)	Trade with United States Act 1785	An Act for further continuing an Act, entitled, "An Act for facilitating the Trade and Intercourse."	The whole act.
25 Geo. 3. c. 16 (I)	N/A	An Act for granting the Sum of Nine thousand Pounds to the Incorporated Society, for supporting the Protestant Charter Schools of this Kingdom.	The whole act.
25 Geo. 3. c. 17 (I)	N/A	An Act to prevent the Practice of seducing Artificers and Manufacturers of this Kingdom, and of exporting the several Tools and Utensils made use of in preparing and working up the Manufactures thereof, into Parts beyond the Seas.	The whole act.
25 Geo. 3. c. 18 (I)	N/A	An Act for granting to His Majesty, His Heirs and Successors, several Duties therein mentioned, to be levied by the Commissioners for managing the Stamp Duties.	The whole act.
25 Geo. 3. c. 19 (I)	Post Office Act 1785	An Act for granting to His Majesty, his Heirs and Successors, certain Duties and Rates upon the Postage.	The whole act.
25 Geo. 3. c. 20 (I)	N/A	An Act for licensing Hawkers and Pedlars, petty Chapmen, and other Persons.	The whole act.
25 Geo. 3. c. 22 (I)	N/A	An Act for granting the Sum of Eight thousand six hundred Pounds to the Corporation for Relief of the Poor in the City of Dublin.	The whole act.
25 Geo. 3. c. 23 (I)	N/A	An Act for granting the Sum of One thousand Pounds to the Governors of the Hibernian School, for the Support of that Charity.	The whole act.
25 Geo. 3. c. 24 (I)	N/A	An Act for granting the Sum of Three thousand Pounds to the Lord Chancellor and Chief Judges for the Purposes therein mentioned.	The whole act.
25 Geo. 3. c. 25 (I)	N/A	An Act for granting the Sum of One thousand Pounds to the Hibernian Marine Society, towards supporting the said Charity.	The whole act.
25 Geo. 3. c. 26 (I)	N/A	An Act for granting the Sum of Five thousand Pounds to the Board of First Fruits, for the Purposes therein mentioned.	The whole act.
25 Geo. 3. c. 27 (I)	N/A	An Act for granting the Sum of Five thousand Pounds to the Dublin Society, for the Purposes therein mentioned.	The whole act.
25 Geo. 3. c. 28 (I)	N/A	An Act for punishing Mutiny and Desertion, and for the better Payment of the Army and their Quarters within this Kingdom.	The whole act.
25 Geo. 3. c. 29 (I)	N/A	An Act for granting the Sum of Ten thousand Pounds to the Governors of the Foundling Hospital and Workhouse, for the Purposes therein mentioned.	The whole act.
25 Geo. 3. c. 30 (I)	N/A	An Act for granting to His Majesty the Duty therein mentioned, to be paid to the Trustees of the Royal Exchange.	The whole act.
25 Geo. 3. c. 32 (I)	N/A	An Act for the Relief of Persons who have omitted to qualify themselves according to Law.	The whole act.
25 Geo. 3. c. 34 (I)	N/A	An Act for continuing and amending several Laws relating to His Majesty's Revenue, and for more effectually preventing of Frauds therein.	The whole act.
25 Geo. 3. c. 36 (I)	Sheriffs Act 1785	An Act to amend an Act passed in the Twelfth Year of His late Majesty George the First.	Section One. Section Four from "in which no essoign" to the end of the Section. Section Six from "and to be applied" to the end of the Section.
25 Geo. 3. c. 38 (I)	N/A	An Act to remedy the Inconveniencies which arise to ecclesiastical Persons, from the Loss of their Titles and Certificates of their other Qualifications.	The whole act.
25 Geo. 3. c. 43 (I)	Parnell Square Act 1785	An Act for the completing and effectually Lighting and Watching of Rutland Square, and for the better Support and Maintenance of the Hospital for the Relief of poor Lying-in Women in the City of Dublin, and for other Purposes therein mentioned.	Section Eleven.
25 Geo. 3. c. 44 (I)	N/A	An Act for the more speedy and easy Recovery of Small Debts, in the Manor Courts within this Kingdom, and for regulating the Costs of Proceedings for that Purpose therein.	The whole act.
25 Geo. 3. c. 45 (I)	Lotteries Act 1785	An Act for amending the Laws for regulating Lottery Offices.	The whole act.
25 Geo. 3. c. 46 (I)	N/A	An Act for the Relief of Insolvent Debtors, with respect to the Imprisonment of their Persons.	The whole act.
25 Geo. 3. c. 47 (I)	Registration of Deeds Act 1785	An Act for amending the several Laws relating to the Registering of Wills and Deeds in the Registry Office of this Kingdom, and for the better regulating and conducting the Business of the said Office.	Section One. Section Two. Section Three from "That so much" to "is hereby repealed; and".
25 Geo. 3. c. 48 (I)	N/A	An Act for granting the Sums of Twenty thousand Pounds, Five thousand Pounds, and Four thousand Pounds, to certain Trustees, and for promoting the several Manufactures therein named.	The whole act.
25 Geo. 3. c. 49 (I)	Ecclesiastical Lands Act 1785	An Act to explain and amend the several Acts made in this Kingdom to encourage the Building of Houses, and making other Improvements on Church Lands, and for other Purposes.	Section Six.
25 Geo. 3. c. 50 (I)	Dublin Foundling Hospital Act 1785	An Act for the better Support and Maintenance of the Foundling Hospital.	Sections One, Two, Six, and Seven.
25 Geo. 3. c. 51 (I)	N/A	An Act for preventing vexatious Injunctions to stay Proceedings at Law, and for giving Costs to Defendants in Courts of Equity in certain Cases.	The whole act.
25 Geo. 3. c. 54 (I)	N/A	An Act for reviving, continuing, and amending several temporary Statutes.	The whole act.
25 Geo. 3. c. 57 (I)	N/A	An Act to prevent the Exportation of Hay from this Kingdom for a limited Time.	The whole act.
25 Geo. 3. c. 59 (I)	N/A	An Act to explain and amend an Act passed in the Twenty-third and Twenty-fourth Years of His present Majesty, entitled "An Act for ascertaining the Qualifications of such Persons as shall take out Commissions of the Peace for the Counties at large."	The whole act.
25 Geo. 3. c. 60 (I)	N/A	An Act for repealing an Act made in the first Year of the Reign of His late Majesty King George the Second, entitled, "An Act for Regulating the Measures made use of in Buying and Selling of Corn, and for promoting Husbandry in this Kingdom."	The whole act.
25 Geo. 3. c. 61 (I)	N/A	An Act for directing the Application of Two thousand five hundred Pounds, granted to the Dublin Society, for the Encouragement of Manufactures, Arts, and Sciences.	The whole act.
25 Geo. 3. c. 62 (I)	Leases for Corn Mills Act 1785	An Act to explain and amend several Laws now in Force for the Encouragement of Agriculture.	Sections One to Eleven. Section Twelve from "every archbishop" to "bishop respectively, and to and for", and from "the successors of every such" to "respectively, and against". Sections Sixteen to Twenty-three.
26 Geo. 3. c. 1 (I)	N/A	An Act for granting unto His Majesty, His Heirs and Successors, an additional Duty on Wine.	The whole act.
26 Geo. 3. c. 2	N/A	An Act for granting to His Majesty the several Aids, Duties, Rates, Impositions, and Taxes.	The whole act.
26 Geo. 3. c. 3	N/A	An Act for granting unto His Majesty, His Heirs and Successors, certain Duties upon Malt.	The whole act.
26 Geo. 3. c. 4	N/A	An Act to promote the Linen and Hempen Manufacture by encreasing the Supply of Irish Flax Seed, and encouraging the Export of Linens and Sailcloth, and for granting to His Majesty, His Heirs and Successors, the Duties therein mentioned.	The whole act.
26 Geo. 3. c. 5	N/A	An Act for regulating the Sugar Trade, and for granting to His Majesty, His Heirs and Successors, the Duties therein mentioned.	The whole act.
26 Geo. 3. c. 6	N/A	An Act for regulating the Tobacco Trade, and for granting to His Majesty, His Heirs and Successors, the Duties therein mentioned.	The whole act.
26 Geo. 3. c. 7	Coffee Duties Act 1786	An Act for granting to His Majesty, His Heirs and Successors, the several Duties therein mentioned upon Coffee.	The whole act.
26 Geo. 3. c. 8	Carriage Duties Act 1786	An Act for granting unto His Majesty, His Heirs and Successors, certain Duties on Carriages.	The whole act.
26 Geo. 3. c. 9	N/A	An Act for the Advancement of Trade, and for granting to His Majesty, His Heirs and Successors, the several Duties therein mentioned.	The whole act.
26 Geo. 3. c. 10	N/A	An Act for granting certain Duties upon Licenses, to be taken out by the several Persons therein mentioned.	The whole act.
26 Geo. 3. c. 11 (I)	N/A	An Act for granting to His Majesty the Duty therein mentioned, to be paid to the Trustees of the Royal Exchange.	The whole act.
26 Geo. 3. c. 12 (I)	N/A	An Act for granting to His Majesty, His Heirs and Successors, certain Duties and Rates upon the Portage and Conveyance of all Letters and Packets within this Kingdom, and for the Purposes therein mentioned.	The whole act.
26 Geo. 3. c. 13 (I)	N/A	An Act for Licensing Hawkers and Pedlars, petty Chapmen, and other Persons.	The whole act.
26 Geo. 3. c. 15 (I)	N/A	An Act for granting to His Majesty, His Heirs and Successors, several Duties therein mentioned, to be levied by the Commissioners for managing the Stamp Duties.	The whole act.
26 Geo. 3. c. 16 (I)	Trade with United States Act 1786	An Act for facilitating the Trade and Intercourse between this Kingdom and the United States of America.	The whole act.
26 Geo. 3. c. 18 (I)	Mutiny Act (Ireland) 1786	An Act for punishing Mutiny and Desertion, and for the better Payment of the Army and their Quarters within this Kingdom.	The whole act.
26 Geo. 3. c. 21 (I)	N/A	An Act for continuing and amending several Laws relating to His Majesty's Revenue, and for the more effectually preventing of Frauds therein, and for other Purposes therein mentioned.	The whole act.
26 Geo. 3. c. 24 (I)	Forcible Entry Act 1786	An Act for the better Execution of the Law within the City of Dublin, and certain Parts adjacent thereto.	Except Sections Sixty-four to Sixty-Six, and Section Seventy-four.
26 Geo. 3. c. 25 (I)	N/A	An Act for applying Ten thousand Pounds, being part of Seventy-one thousand six hundred Pounds, granted this Session of Parliament, for the Advancement of Fisheries, Trade, and Manufactures.	The whole act.
26 Geo. 3. c. 34 (I)	N/A	An Act for the more effectually promoting Partnerships in Trade, by amending the Laws respecting the same.	The whole act.
26 Geo. 3. c. 35 (I)	N/A	An Act to explain and amend an Act passed in the thirteenth and fourteenth Years of His present Majesty, entitled "An Act for the preventing Frauds in the Measurement of Lime."	The whole act.
26 Geo. 3. c. 43 (I)	Pawnbrokers Act 1786	An Act to establish the Business of a Pawnbroker, and to authorize such Persons as shall be duly qualified to carry on the same, to lend Money on Pawns or Pledges, and to receive Interest at a higher Rate than heretofore was recoverable by Law.	Section Three. Section Eight, from "and if within" to "justices shall seem proper." Sections Seventeen, Nineteen, Twenty, and Forty-five. Sections Five, Ten, Thirteen, Fifteen, Sixteen, Eighteen, Twenty-one, Twenty-nine, Thirty, Thirty-two, Thirty-five, and Forty-two, so far as they relate to the appropriation of penalties.
26 Geo. 3. c. 44 (I)	N/A	An Act for the Relief of Persons who have omitted to qualify themselves according to Law.	The whole act.
26 Geo. 3. c. 45 (I)	N/A	An Act to enable the Grand Juries of the several Counties, Counties of Cities, and Counties of Towns within this Kingdom, to grant such Sums as shall be necessary for building and repairing Bridewells therein.	The whole act.
26 Geo. 3. c. 46 (I)	N/A	An Act for granting the Sum of Twenty thousand Pounds to certain Trustees for distributing Bounties, and promoting the several Manufactures therein named.	The whole act.
26 Geo. 3. c. 47 (I)	N/A	An Act for granting the Sum of Nine thousand Pounds to the Incorporated Society, for supporting the Protestant Charter Schools of this Kingdom.	The whole act.
26 Geo. 3. c. 48 (I)	N/A	An Act for granting the Sum of Five thousand Pounds to the Dublin Society for the Purposes therein mentioned.	The whole act.
26 Geo. 3. c. 49 (I)	N/A	An Act for granting the Sum of Three thousand Pounds to the Lord Chancellor and Chief Judges, for the Purposes therein mentioned.	The whole act.
26 Geo. 3. c. 50 (I)	Inland Fisheries Act 1786	An Act to explain and amend an Act passed in the Twenty-third and Twenty-fourth Years of His present Majesty, entitled "An Act for the Protection and Improvement of the Inland Fisheries of this Kingdom."	Section Eight to "is hereby repealed."
26 Geo. 3. c. 51 (I)	N/A	An Act for granting the Sum of Five thousand Pounds to the Governors of the Foundling Hospital and Workhouse for the Purposes therein mentioned.	The whole act.
26 Geo. 3. c. 52 (I)	N/A	An Act for granting the Sum of Eight thousand six hundred Pounds to the Corporation for the Relief of the Poor in the City of Dublin.	The whole act.
26 Geo. 3. c. 53 (I)	N/A	An Act for granting the Sum of Five thousand Pounds to the Board of First Fruits for the Purposes therein mentioned.	The whole act.
26 Geo. 3. c. 54 (I)	N/A	An Act for granting the Sum of One thousand Pounds to the Governors of the Hibernian School for the Support of that Charity.	The whole act.
26 Geo. 3. c. 55 (I)	N/A	An Act for granting the Sum of One thousand Pounds to the Hibernian Marine Society, towards supporting the said Charity.	The whole act.
26 Geo. 3. c. 57 (I)	Dublin Theatres Act 1786	An Act regulating the Stages in the City and County of Dublin.	Section Two from "one moiety" to "sue for the same", and from "in which no essoign" to the end of the Section.
27 Geo. 3. c. 1 (I)	N/A	An Act for granting unto His Majesty, His Heirs and Successors, an additional Duty on Wines.	The whole act.
27 Geo. 3. c. 2 (I)	N/A	An Act for granting to His Majesty the several Aids, Duties, Rates, Impositions, and Taxes.	The whole act.
27 Geo. 3. c. 3 (I)	Malt Duties Act 1787	An Act for granting unto His Majesty, His Heirs and Successors, certain Duties upon Malt.	The whole act.
27 Geo. 3. c. 4 (I)	N/A	An Act to promote the Linen and Hempen Manufacture, by encreasing the Supply of Irish Flax Seed, and encouraging the Export of Linens and Sail Cloth, and for granting to His Majesty, His Heirs and Successors, the Duties therein mentioned.	The whole act.
27 Geo. 3. c. 5 (I)	N/A	An Act for regulating and extending the Tobacco Trade, and for granting to His Majesty, His Heirs and Successors, the Duties therein mentioned.	The whole act.
27 Geo. 3. c. 6 (I)	N/A	An Act for the Advancement of Trade, and for granting to His Majesty, His Heirs and Successors, the several Duties therein mentioned.	The whole act.
27 Geo. 3. c. 7 (I)	N/A	An Act for regulating the Sugar Trade, and for granting to His Majesty, His Heirs and Successors, the Duties therein mentioned.	The whole act.
27 Geo. 3. c. 8 (I)	Coffee Duties Act 1787	An Act for granting to His Majesty, His Heirs and Successors, the several Duties therein mentioned upon Coffee.	The whole act.
27 Geo. 3. c. 9 (I)	N/A	An Act for granting certain Aids, Duties, and Impositions to His Majesty, His Heirs and Successors, for a time therein mentioned, and for giving effect to a Treaty of Commerce and Navigation, concluded between His Majesty and the Most Christian King.	The whole act.
27 Geo. 3. c. 10 (I)	N/A	An Act for granting to His Majesty, His Heirs and Successors, several Duties therein mentioned, to be levied by the Commissioners for managing the Stamp Duties.	The whole act.
27 Geo. 3. c. 11 (I)	N/A	An Act for granting to His Majesty, His Heirs and Successors, certain Duties and Rates upon the Portage and Conveyance of all Letters and Packets within this Kingdom, and for other purposes therein mentioned.	The whole act.
27 Geo. 3. c. 12 (I)	N/A	An Act for licensing Hawkers and Pedlars, Petty Chapmen, and other Persons.	The whole act.
27 Geo. 3. c. 13 (I)	N/A	An Act for granting the Sum of Seventeen thousand Pounds to certain Trustees for distributing Bounties, and promoting the several manufactures therein named.	The whole act.
27 Geo. 3. c. 14 (I)	N/A	An Act for granting to His Majesty, His Heirs and Successors, certain Duties upon Carriages.	The whole act.
27 Geo. 3. c. 15 (I)	Riot Act 1787	An Act to prevent tumultuous Risings and Assemblies, and for the more effectual punishment of persons guilty of Outrage, Riot, and illegal Combination, and of Administering and taking unlawful Oaths.	Section Eleven. Section Twelve from "and that this Act" to the end of the Section.
27 Geo. 3. c. 16 (I)	Mutiny Act (Ireland) 1787	An Act for punishing Mutiny and Desertion, and for the better Payment of the Army and their Quarters within this Kingdom.	The whole act.
27 Geo. 3. c. 17 (I)	N/A	An Act for granting certain Duties upon Licenses to be taken out by the several Persons therein mentioned.	The whole act.
27 Geo. 3. c. 18 (I)	N/A	An Act for granting the Sum of Four thousand Pounds to the Trustees of the Linen Manufacture, for the purposes therein mentioned.	The whole act.
27 Geo. 3. c. 19 (I)	N/A	An Act for granting the Sum of Six thousand Pounds to the Lord Chancellor and Chief Judges for the purposes therein mentioned.	The whole act.
27 Geo. 3. c. 22 (I)	N/A	An Act to render more effectual an Act, entitled "An Act for the more speedy and easy Recovery of small Debts in the Manor Courts within this Kingdom, and for regulating the Costs of Proceedings for that purpose therein."	The whole act.
27 Geo. 3. c. 24 (I)	N/A	An Act for granting to His Majesty the Duty therein mentioned to be paid to the Trustees of the Royal Exchange.	The whole act.
27 Geo. 3. c. 25 (I)	Pilots Act 1787	An Act for promoting the Improvement of Ports and Harbours in this Kingdom.	Except Sections Nine and Ten.
27 Geo. 3. c. 26 (I)	N/A	An Act for the better Collection of His Majesty's Revenue, and for the continuation and amendment of several Laws heretofore made for that Purpose.	The whole act.
27 Geo. 3. c. 27 (I)	Mediterranean Passes Act 1787	An Act to prevent the Forging, Selling, or otherwise improperly Disposing of Mediterranean Passes.	The whole act.
27 Geo. 3. c. 29 (I)	N/A	An Act for granting to His Majesty the several Duties therein mentioned, and for the better regulation of Lottery Offices.	The whole act.
27 Geo. 3. c. 30 (I)	N/A	An Act for directing the application of the Funds granted by Parliament for promoting and carrying on Inland Navigations in this Kingdom, and for the purposes therein mentioned.	The whole act.
27 Geo. 3. c. 33 (I)	N/A	An Act to empower the Commissioners of His Majesty's Revenue to grant repayments of certain Duties on Portugal and Spanish Wines in certain cases.	The whole act.
27 Geo. 3. c. 35 (I)	Game Act 1787	An Act for the Preservation of the Game.	Sections One, Two, Five, Six, Seven, Nine, Fourteen, Fifteen, and Twenty-one.
27 Geo. 3. c. 36 (I)	N/A	An Act to enable all Ecclesiastical Persons and Bodies, Rectors, Vicars, and Curates, and Impropriators.	The whole act.
27 Geo. 3. c. 38 (I)	N/A	An Act for the better regulation of Hackney Carriages.	The whole act.
27 Geo. 3. c. 39 (I)	N/A	An Act to explain and amend an Act passed in the Twenty-sixth Year of His present Majesty's Reign entitled "An Act for amending, and carrying more effectually into Force, the several Laws now in being for regulating the Public Gaols and Prisons throughout this Kingdom."	The whole act.
27 Geo. 3. c. 40 (I)	Peace Preservation Act 1787	An Act for the better Execution of the Law, and Preservation of the Peace within Counties at large.	The whole act.
27 Geo. 3. c. 41 (I)	Weights and Measures Act 1787	An Act for amending and making perpetual an Act, entitled "An Act for buying and selling all sorts of Corn and Meal, and other Things therein mentioned, by Weight, and for the more effectual preventing of Frauds committed in the buying and selling thereof."	Section One. Section Two, the words "to be paid the Informer."
27 Geo. 3. c. 42 (I)	N/A	An Act to prevent Frauds in obtaining Bounties under several Laws now in force for the Encouragement of Agriculture, and for rendering the carriage of Corn to the City of Dublin less expensive.	The whole act.
27 Geo. 3. c. 44 (I)	N/A	An Act to explain and amend an Act passed in the Eleventh and Twelfth Years of His present Majesty.	The whole act.
27 Geo. 3. c. 47 (I)	Trade with United States Act 1787	An Act for continuing an Act, entitled "An Act for facilitating the Trade and Intercourse between this Kingdom and the United States of America."	The whole act.
27 Geo. 3. c. 48 (I)	Quarantine Act 1787	An Act to continue an Act passed in the Eleventh Year of His present Majesty's Reign.	The whole act.
27 Geo. 3. c. 49 (I)	N/A	An Act for amending an Act, entitled "An Act for discharging certain Arrears of Quit, Crown, and Composition Rents, which have been growing due for Twenty Years last past, on the Terms, and in the manner therein mentioned."	The whole act.
27 Geo. 3. c. 50 (I)	N/A	An Act for the support and encouragement of the Fisheries carried on in the Greenland Seas and Davis's Streights.	The whole act.
27 Geo. 3. c. 51 (I)	N/A	An Act for the relief of Persons who have omitted to qualify themselves according to Law.	The whole act.
27 Geo. 3. c. 52 (I)	Stealing Lead, Iron, etc. Act 1787	An Act to punish more effectually Persons who shall steal any old Lead, Iron Bars or Rails, or Iron or Brass Knockers.	Section Five.
27 Geo. 3. c. 54 (I)	N/A	An Act for granting the Sum of Five thousand Pounds to the Dublin Society, for the purposes therein mentioned.	The whole act.
27 Geo. 3. c. 55 (I)	N/A	An Act for granting the several Sums therein mentioned for certain pious and charitable Purposes.	The whole act.
27 Geo. 3. c. 56 (I)	N/A	An Act for granting the several Sums therein mentioned for certain Public Uses, and for the other Purposes therein mentioned.	The whole act.
27 Geo. 3. c. 57 (I)	N/A	An Act for amending an Act made in the Eleventh and Twelfth Years of His present Majesty's Reign.	The whole act.
28 Geo. 3. c. 1 (I)	N/A	An Act for granting unto His Majesty, His Heirs and Successors, an additional Duty on Wines.	The whole act.
28 Geo. 3. c. 2	N/A	An Act for granting to His Majesty the several Aids, Duties, Rates, Impositions, and Taxes.	The whole act.
28 Geo. 3. c. 3	Malt Duties Act 1788	An Act for granting unto His Majesty, His Heirs and Successors, certain Duties upon Malt.	The whole act.
28 Geo. 3. c. 4	N/A	An Act for the advancement of Trade, and for granting to His Majesty, His Heirs and Successors, the several Duties therein mentioned.	The whole act.
28 Geo. 3. c. 5	N/A	An Act for regulating and extending the Tobacco Trade, and for granting to His Majesty, His Heirs and Successors, the Duties therein mentioned.	The whole act.
28 Geo. 3. c. 6	N/A	An Act for regulating the Sugar Trade, and for granting to His Majesty, His Heirs and Successors, the Duties therein mentioned.	The whole act.
28 Geo. 3. c. 7	N/A	An Act for regulating the Coffee Trade, and for granting to His Majesty, His Heirs and Successors, the several Duties therein mentioned upon Coffee.	The whole act.
28 Geo. 3. c. 9	N/A	An Act for granting to His Majesty, His Heirs and Successors, the several Duties therein mentioned, to be levied by the Commissioners for managing the Stamp Duties.	The whole act.
28 Geo. 3. c. 10	N/A	An Act for granting certain Aids, Duties, and Impositions, to His Majesty, His Heirs and Successors, for the Time therein mentioned, and for continuing the Effect of a Treaty of Commerce and Navigation concluded between His Majesty and the most Christian King.	The whole act.
28 Geo. 3. c. 11	N/A	An Act for Licensing Hawkers and Pedlars, petty Chapmen, and other Persons.	The whole act.
28 Geo. 3. c. 12	N/A	An Act for granting to His Majesty, His Heirs and Successors, certain Duties and Rates upon the Portage and Conveyance of all Letters and Packets within this Kingdom, and for other Purposes therein mentioned.	The whole act.
28 Geo. 3. c. 15	Endowed Schools Commission Act 1788	An Act to enable the Lord Lieutenant or other Chief Governor or Governors of this Kingdom, to appoint Commissioners.	The whole act.
28 Geo. 3. c. 16	N/A	An Act for granting certain Duties upon Licenses, to be taken out by the several Persons therein mentioned.	The whole act.
28 Geo. 3. c. 17	Carriage Duties Act 1788	An Act for granting unto His Majesty, his Heirs and Successors, certain Duties upon Carriages.	The whole act.
28 Geo. 3. c. 18	Trade with United States Act 1788	An Act for continuing an Act, entitled "An Act for facilitating the Trade and Intercourse between this Kingdom and the United States of America."	The whole act.
28 Geo. 3. c. 19	Mutiny Act (Ireland) 1788	An Act for punishing Mutiny and Desertion, and for the better Payment of the Army and their Quarters within this Kingdom.	The whole act.
28 Geo. 3. c. 20	N/A	An Act for granting the Sum of Six thousand Pounds to the Lord Chancellor and Chief Judges for the Purposes therein mentioned.	The whole act.
28 Geo. 3. c. 21	N/A	An Act for granting the Sum of Four thousand Pounds to the Trustees of the Linen Manufacture.	The whole act.
28 Geo. 3. c. 22	N/A	An Act for granting the Sum of Five thousand Pounds to the Dublin Society for the Purposes therein mentioned.	The whole act.
28 Geo. 3. c. 23	N/A	An Act for granting to His Majesty the Duty therein mentioned, to be paid to the Trustees of the Royal Exchange.	The whole act.
28 Geo. 3. c. 24	Election of Lord Justice and Governor of Ireland Act 1788	An Act for repealing an Act made in the Thirty-third Year of the Reign of King Henry the Eighth, entitled "An Act for the Election of the Lord Justice, and also for the Election of a Lord Justice and Governor of this Realm upon the Event, and in the Manner therein mentioned."	Sections Four and Five.
28 Geo. 3. c. 26	N/A	An Act for continuing the Encouragement by Bounties to the several Manufactures therein named for a certain and limited Time.	The whole act.
28 Geo. 3. c. 29	N/A	An Act for the better ascertaining the Tithes of Hemp.	The whole act.
28 Geo. 3. c. 30	N/A	An Act for granting the several Sums therein mentioned for certain Pious and Charitable Purposes.	The whole act.
28 Geo. 3. c. 31	N/A	An Act for the Amendment of the Law in certain Particulars therein mentioned.	The whole act.
28 Geo. 3. c. 32	N/A	An Act to repeal an Act passed in the Twenty-eighth Year of the Reign of King Henry the Eighth.	The whole act.
28 Geo. 3. c. 34	N/A	An Act for more effectually preventing Frauds against His Majesty's Revenue, and for continuing and amending the several Acts of Parliament therein mentioned.	The whole act.
28 Geo. 3. c. 35	N/A	An Act for the better securing of Purchasers of Lands, under Decrees in Courts of Equity.	The whole act.
28 Geo. 3. c. 36	Timber Act 1788	An Act to explain and amend an Act made in the Fifth and Sixth Years of His present Majesty, George the Third, entitled "An Act for the encouraging the Cultivation, and for the better Preservation of Trees, Shrubs, Plants, and Roots."	The whole act.
28 Geo. 3. c. 40	N/A	An Act for the further Payment of the Debts of the late Corporation for promoting Inland Navigations in Ireland.	The whole act.
28 Geo. 3. c. 41	N/A	An Act for the Relief of Persons who have omitted to qualify themselves according to Law.	The whole act.
28 Geo. 3. c. 42	N/A	An Act for continuing the Acts relative to Bankrupts, and for reviving, continuing, and amending certain temporary Statutes.	The whole act.
28 Geo. 3. c. 44	N/A	An Act to enable all Ecclesiastical Persons and Bodies, Rectors, Vicars, and Curates, and Impropriators.	The whole act.
28 Geo. 3. c. 45	N/A	An Act for rendering more effectual an Act passed in the Twenty-sixth Year of the Reign of His present Majesty King George the Third.	The whole act.
28 Geo. 3. c. 46	N/A	An Act for the Relief of Insolvent Debtors, with respect to the Imprisonment of their Persons.	The whole act.
28 Geo. 3. c. 49	Pawnbrokers Act 1788	An Act to explain, amend, and render more effectual an Act passed in the Twenty-sixth Year of the reign of His present Majesty.	Sections One, Eight, Ten, Seventeen, Eighteen, and Twenty, so far as they relate to the Appropriation of Penalties. Section Twenty-three.
29 Geo. 3. c. 1 (I)	N/A	An Act for granting unto His Majesty, His Heirs and Successors, an additional Duty on Wines.	The whole act.
29 Geo. 3. c. 2 (I)	N/A	An Act for granting to His Majesty the several Aids, Duties, Rates, Impositions, and Taxes.	The whole act.
29 Geo. 3. c. 3 (I)	N/A	An Act for the Advancement of Trade, and for granting to His Majesty, His Heirs and Successors, the several Duties therein mentioned.	The whole act.
29 Geo. 3. c. 4 (I)	N/A	An Act for regulating the Sugar Trade, and for granting to His Majesty, His Heirs and Successors, the Duties therein mentioned.	The whole act.
29 Geo. 3. c. 5 (I)	N/A	An Act for regulating the Coffee Trade, and for granting to His Majesty, His Heirs and Successors, the several Duties therein mentioned upon Coffee.	The whole act.
29 Geo. 3. c. 6 (I)	N/A	An Act for granting unto His Majesty, His Heirs and Successors, certain Duties upon Malt.	The whole act.
29 Geo. 3. c. 7 (I)	Trade with United States Act 1789	An Act for further continuing an Act, entitled "An Act for facilitating the Trade and Intercourse between this Kingdom and the United States of America."	The whole act.
29 Geo. 3. c. 8 (I)	Postage Act 1789	An Act for granting to His Majesty, His Heirs and Successors, certain Duties and Rates upon the Portage and Conveyance of all Letters and Packets within this Kingdom.	The whole act.
29 Geo. 3. c. 9 (I)	Stamp Act 1789	An Act for granting to His Majesty, His Heirs and Successors, several Duties therein mentioned, to be levied by the Commissioners for managing the Stamp Duties.	The whole act.
29 Geo. 3. c. 10 (I)	Tobacco Act 1789	An Act for regulating and extending the Tobacco Trade, and for granting to His Majesty, His Heirs and Successors, the Duties therein mentioned.	The whole act.
29 Geo. 3. c. 11 (I)	Mutiny Act (Ireland) 1789	An Act for punishing Mutiny and Desertion, and for the better Payment of the Army and their Quarters within this Kingdom.	The whole act.
29 Geo. 3. c. 12 (I)	N/A	An Act for granting certain Aids, Duties, and Impositions to His Majesty, His Heirs and Successors, for the time therein mentioned, and for continuing the Effect of a Treaty of Commerce and Navigation concluded between His Majesty and the most Christian King.	The whole act.
29 Geo. 3. c. 13 (I)	N/A	An Act to promote the Linen and Hempen Manufacture by encreasing the Supply of Irish Flax-seed, and encouraging the Export of Linens and Sailcloth, and for granting to His Majesty, His Heirs and Successors, the Duties therein mentioned.	The whole act.
29 Geo. 3. c. 14 (I)	N/A	An Act for granting certain Duties upon Licenses, to be taken out by the several persons therein mentioned.	The whole act.
29 Geo. 3. c. 15 (I)	Carriage Duties Act 1789	An Act for granting unto His Majesty, His Heirs and Successors, certain Duties upon Carriages.	The whole act.
29 Geo. 3. c. 16 (I)	N/A	An Act for licensing Hawkers and Pedlars, Petty Chapmen, and other Persons.	The whole act.
29 Geo. 3. c. 17 (I)	Wine Duties	An Act for granting unto His Majesty, His Heirs and Successors, Duties on Wines therein mentioned, and Cordage; and also a tax upon all Salaries, Profits of Employments, Fees, and Pensions therein mentioned.	The whole act.
29 Geo. 3. c. 18 (I)	N/A	An Act for granting unto His Majesty, His Heirs and Successors, an additional Duty on Hides.	The whole act.
29 Geo. 3. c. 19 (I)	Duties on Malt etc. Act 1789	An Act for granting unto His Majesty, His Heirs and Successors, certain Duties upon Malt.	The whole act.
29 Geo. 3. c. 20 (I)	Duties on Malt etc. Act 1789	An Act for granting to His Majesty, His Heirs and Successors, certain Duties and Rates upon the Portage and Conveyance of all Letters and Packets within this Kingdom.	The whole act.
29 Geo. 3. c. 21 (I)	Stamp (No. 2) Act 1789	An Act for granting to His Majesty, His Heirs and Successors, several Duties therein mentioned, to be levied by the Commissioners for managing the Stamp Duties.	The whole act.
29 Geo. 3. c. 22 (I)	Mutiny (No. 2) Act (Ireland) 1789	An Act for punishing Mutiny and Desertion, and for the better Payment of the Army and their Quarters within this Kingdom.	The whole act.
29 Geo. 3. c. 25 (I)	Revenue Act 1789	An Act for continuing and amending certain Laws heretofore made concerning His Majesty's Revenue, and for the more effectually preventing of Frauds therein.	The whole act.
29 Geo. 3. c. 27 (I)	Churches and Glebes Act 1789	An Act for the better providing for the Repairs of Churches, and the Residence of the Clergy.	Section Two.
29 Geo. 3. c. 30 (I)	Commons Act 1789	An Act for preventing the Commission of Waste on the several Commons in this Kingdom.	Section Three.
29 Geo. 3. c. 32 (I)	N/A	An Act for the Relief of Persons who have omitted to qualify themselves according to Law.	The whole act.
29 Geo. 3. c. 33 (I)	N/A	An Act for the Promotion and Encouragement of Inland Navigation.	Sections One to Sixteen. Sections Nineteen, Twenty, Twenty-six, and Twenty-seven.
29 Geo. 3. c. 35 (I)	Grant for Record Office and Law Courts Act 1789	An Act for granting the Sum of Six thousand Pounds to the Lord Chancellor and Chief Judges for the Purposes therein mentioned.	The whole act.
29 Geo. 3. c. 36 (I)	N/A	An Act for granting the Sum of Five thousand Pounds to the Dublin Society for the Purposes therein mentioned.	The whole act.
29 Geo. 3. c. 37 (I)	N/A	An Act for granting to His Majesty the Duty therein mentioned to be paid to the Trustees of the Royal Exchange.	The whole act.
29 Geo. 3. c. 38 (I)	Duties on Spices Act 1789	An Act to continue an Act passed in the Twenty-third and Twenty-fourth Years of the Reign of His present Majesty, entitled "An Act for regulating the Import of Cinnamon, Cloves, Mace, and Nutmegs, and for the better collecting the Duties thereon."	The whole act.
29 Geo. 3. c. 40 (I)	Expiring Laws Continuance Act 1789	An Act for continuing certain temporary Statutes.	The whole act.
29 Geo. 3. c. 41 (I)	N/A	An Act for granting the several Sums therein mentioned for certain pious and charitable Purposes.	The whole act.
29 Geo. 3. c. 42 (I)	Water Supply Act 1789	An Act for the better supplying the Inhabitants of certain Cities and Towns with Water.	Sections Three and Four. Section Five, the words "to any Person who shall sue for the same."
30 Geo. 3. c. 1 (I)	N/A	An Act for granting unto His Majesty, His Heirs and Successors, an additional Duty on Wines.	The whole act.
30 Geo. 3. c. 2 (I)	N/A	An Act for granting to His Majesty the several Aids, Duties, Rates, Impositions, and Taxes.	The whole act.
30 Geo. 3. c. 3 (I)	N/A	An Act for the Advancement of Trade, and for granting to His Majesty, His Heirs and Successors, the several Duties therein mentioned.	The whole act.
30 Geo. 3. c. 4 (I)	N/A	An Act for regulating the Sugar Trade, and for granting to His Majesty, His Heirs and Successors, the Duties therein mentioned.	The whole act.
30 Geo. 3. c. 5 (I)	N/A	An Act for regulating the Coffee Trade, and for granting to His Majesty, His Heirs and Successors, the several Duties therein mentioned upon Coffee.	The whole act.
30 Geo. 3. c. 6 (I)	N/A	An Act for granting unto His Majesty, His Heirs and Successors, certain Duties upon Malt.	The whole act.
30 Geo. 3. c. 7 (I)	N/A	An Act for granting certain Aids, Duties, and Impositions to His Majesty, His Heirs and Successors, for the Time therein mentioned, and for continuing the Effect of a Treaty of Commerce and Navigation concluded between His Majesty and the most Christian King.	The whole act.
30 Geo. 3. c. 8 (I)	N/A	An Act to promote the Linen and Hempen Manufactures by encreasing the supply of Irish Flax-seed, and encouraging the Export of Linens and Sail Cloth, and for granting to His Majesty, His Heirs and Successors, the Duties therein mentioned.	The whole act.
30 Geo. 3. c. 9 (I)	N/A	An Act to enable Grand Juries to present for Coroners as therein mentioned, instead of the Sums which they are now by Law empowered to present.	The whole act.
30 Geo. 3. c. 10 (I)	N/A	An Act for granting unto His Majesty, His Heirs and Successors, certain Duties upon Carriages.	The whole act.
30 Geo. 3. c. 11 (I)	Licence Duties Act 1790	An Act for granting certain Duties upon Licenses to be taken out by the several Persons therein mentioned.	The whole act.
30 Geo. 3. c. 12 (I)	Tobacco Duties Act 1790	An Act for regulating and extending the Tobacco Trade, and for granting to His Majesty, His Heirs and Successors, the Duties therein mentioned.	The whole act.
30 Geo. 3. c. 13 (I)	Trade with United States Act 1790	An Act for further continuing an Act, entitled "An Act for facilitating the Trade and Intercourse between this Kingdom and the United States of America."	The whole act.
30 Geo. 3. c. 14 (I)	Hawkers and Pedlars Licences Act 1790	An Act for licensing Hawkers and Pedlars, Petty Chapmen, and other Persons.	The whole act.
30 Geo. 3. c. 15 (I)	Postage Act 1790	An Act for granting to His Majesty, His Heirs and Successors, certain Duties and Rates upon the Portage and Conveyance of all Letters and Packets within this Kingdom.	The whole act.
30 Geo. 3. c. 16 (I)	Stamp Act 1790	An Act for granting to His Majesty, His Heirs and Successors, several Duties therein mentioned, to be levied by the Commissioners for managing the Stamp Duties.	The whole act.
30 Geo. 3. c. 18 (I)	Mutiny Act (Ireland) 1790	An Act for punishing Mutiny and Desertion, and for the better Payment of the Army and their Quarters within this Kingdom.	The whole act.
30 Geo. 3. c. 21 (I)	Indemnity Act (Ireland) 1790	An Act for the Relief of persons who have omitted to qualify themselves according to Law.	The whole act.
30 Geo. 3. c. 22 (I)	Revenue Act 1790	An Act for continuing and amending several Laws relating to His Majesty's Revenue, and for the more effectually preventing of Frauds therein, and for other purposes therein mentioned.	The whole act.
30 Geo. 3. c. 23 (I)	Bankruptcy Act 1790	An Act to repeal certain Clauses in an Act passed in the Seventeenth and Eighteenth Years of His Majesty's Reign.	Section One, to "are hereby repealed."
30 Geo. 3. c. 24 (I)	Sea Fisheries Act 1790	An Act to continue an Act, entitled "An Act to amend an Act, entitled 'An Act for the further improvement and extension of the Fisheries on the Coasts of this Kingdom.'"	The whole act.
30 Geo. 3. c. 25 (I)	Pilots Act 1790	An Act to amend an Act, entitled "An Act for promoting the improvement of Ports and Harbours in this Kingdom."	Sections Seven and Eight.
30 Geo. 3. c. 27 (I)	Rotunda Hospital Grant Act 1790	An Act for granting the several Sums therein mentioned for certain pious and charitable Purposes.	Section One and Two.
30 Geo. 3. c. 28 (I)	Agriculture and Manufactures Grants Act 1790	An Act for granting the Sum of Five thousand Pounds to the Dublin Society for the Purposes therein mentioned.	The whole act.
30 Geo. 3. c. 29 (I)	Guardianship of Infants Act 1790	An Act to explain and amend an Act passed in the Fourteenth and Fifteenth Years of the Reign of Charles the Second.	The whole act.
30 Geo. 3. c. 30 (I)	N/A	An Act to amend an Act passed in the Twenty-third and Twenty-fourth Year of His Majesty's Reign, entitled "An Act for regulating the Corn Trade of promoting Agriculture, and providing a regular and steady Supply of Corn."	The whole act.
30 Geo. 3. c. 32 (I)	Transportation Act 1790	An Act for rendering the Transportation of Felons and Vagabonds more easy.	The whole act.
30 Geo. 3. c. 33 (I)	Dublin Port Duties Act 1790	An Act for granting to His Majesty the Duty therein mentioned, to be paid to the Trustees of the Royal Exchange.	The whole act.
30 Geo. 3. c. 34 (I)	Endowed Schools Commission Continuance Act 1790	An Act to continue an Act entitled "An Act to enable the Lord Lieutenant."	The whole act.
30 Geo. 3. c. 35 (I)	Peace Preservation Act Continuance Act 1790	An Act to continue an Act passed in the Twenty-seventh Year of the Reign of His present Majesty, entitled "An Act for the better Execution of the Law."	The whole act.
30 Geo. 3. c. 36 (I)	Charitable Foundation Borrowing Act 1790	An Act for enabling Trustees of Charitable Foundations to promote the Benefit of the same.	The whole act.
30 Geo. 3. c. 37 (I)	Inland Navigation Act 1790	An Act to explain and amend an Act passed in the Twenty-ninth Year of the Reign of His present Majesty, entitled "An Act for the Promotion and Encouragement of Inland Navigation."	Sections One to Three.
30 Geo. 3. c. 41 (I)	Funds in Chancery Act 1790	An Act for enabling the Lord High Chancellor and the Court of Exchequer respectively.	Sections One to Four. Section Five from "and for the Accountant General of the said Court" to "said Chief Baron."
30 Geo. 3. c. 45 (I)	Expiring Laws Continuance Act 1790	An Act for reviving and continuing several temporary Statutes.	The whole act.
30 Geo. 3. sess. 2. c. 1 (I)	Indemnity (No. 2) Act (Ireland) 1790	An Act for continuing an Act passed in the Thirtieth Year of His present Majesty, entitled "An Act for the Relief of Persons who have omitted to qualify themselves according to Law."	The whole act.
31 Geo. 3. c. 1 (I)	N/A	An Act for granting for One Year the several Duties therein mentioned, in lieu of all other Duties.	The whole act.
31 Geo. 3. c. 2 (I)	N/A	An Act for securing the Payment of the Annuities, and of the Interest upon the Principal Sums.	The whole act.
31 Geo. 3. c. 3 (I)	N/A	An Act for granting unto His Majesty, His Heirs and Successors, a Tax on all Salaries, Profits of Employments, Fees, and Pensions; and certain Duties upon Carriages, and for Licensing Hawkers, Pedlars, and other Persons therein mentioned.	The whole act.
31 Geo. 3. c. 4 (I)	Trade with the United States Act 1791	An Act for further continuing an Act, entitled "An Act for facilitating the Trade and Intercourse between this Kingdom and the United States of America."	The whole act.
31 Geo. 3. c. 5 (I)	N/A	An Act for regulating and extending the Tobacco, Sugar, and Coffee Trade.	The whole act.
31 Geo. 3. c. 6 (I)	Agriculture and Manufactures Grant Act 1791	An Act for granting the Sum of Five thousand Pounds to the Dublin Society for the Purposes therein mentioned.	The whole act.
31 Geo. 3. c. 7 (I)	Charities Grants Act 1791	An Act for granting the several Sums therein mentioned for certain pious and charitable Purposes.	The whole act.
31 Geo. 3. c. 8 (I)	Linen Manufactures Grant Act 1791	An Act for granting the sum of Four thousand pounds to the Trustees of the Linen Manufacture, and for other Purposes.	The whole act.
31 Geo. 3. c. 9 (I)	Export Bounties Act 1791	An Act for regulating the Payment of Bounties on the Exportation of certain Manufactures of this Kingdom.	The whole act.
31 Geo. 3. c. 10 (I)	Postage Act 1791	An Act for granting to His Majesty, His Heirs and Successors, certain Duties and Rates upon the Portage and Conveyance of all Letters and Packets within this Kingdom.	The whole act.
31 Geo. 3. c. 11 (I)	Clerks of the Crown and Peace Act 1791	An Act to enable the Grand Juries of the County of Dublin and the County of the City of Dublin to make better provision for the Clerks of the Crown and Peace, by presentment at each Quarter Sessions for said County and City.	The whole act.
31 Geo. 3. c. 12 (I)	Stamp Act 1791	An Act for granting to His Majesty, His Heirs and Successors, several Duties therein mentioned, to be levied by the Commissioners for managing the Stamp Duties.	The whole act.
31 Geo. 3. c. 13 (I)	Spirit Licences Act 1791	An Act for regulating the issuing of Licenses for the Sale of Spirituous Liquors by retail, and for remedying the Abuses which have arisen from the immoderate use of such Liquors.	The whole act.
31 Geo. 3. c. 15 (I)	N/A	An Act for granting unto His Majesty, His Heirs and Successors, an additional Duty on imported Malt.	The whole act.
31 Geo. 3. c. 16 (I)	Revenue Act 1791	An Act for continuing and amending several Laws relating to His Majesty's Revenue, and for the more effectually preventing of Frauds therein.	The whole act.
31 Geo. 3. c. 17 (I)	Prisoners (Rescue) Act 1791	An Act to prevent the horrid Crime of Murder, and to repeal.	Section One, from "that the said recited Act" to "One thousand seven hundred and ninety-one, and". Section Ten, the words "and shall suffer death without benefit of clergy." Sections Eleven and Twelve.
31 Geo. 3. c. 18 (I)	Perjury Act 1791	An Act to render Prosecutions for Perjury and Subornation of Perjury more easy and effectual, and for affirming the Jurisdiction of the Quarter Sessions in cases of Perjury.	Sections One and Two.
31 Geo. 3. c. 21 (I)	Relief of Insolvent Debtors Act 1791	An Act for the Relief of Insolvent Debtors, with respect to the Imprisonment of their Persons.	The whole act.
31 Geo. 3. c. 22 (I)	Bank of Ireland Act 1791	An Act to extend the provisions of an Act passed in the Twenty-first and Twenty-second Years of His Majesty's Reign, entitled "An Act for establishing a Bank by the name of the Governor and Company of the Bank of Ireland."	Section One, from "That such part" to "is hereby repealed, and"; from "the said annuity" to "pounds, together with", and from "and the said governor" to the end of the Section. Section Three to "time to time appoint; and". Sections Five, Six, Eight, and Nine.
31 Geo. 3. c. 23 (I)	N/A	An Act to amend an Act, entitled "An Act to prevent the practice of seducing Artificers and Manufacturers of this Kingdom, and of exporting the several Tools and Utensils made use of in preparing and working up the Manufactures thereof into Parts beyond the Seas."	The whole act.
31 Geo. 3. c. 24 (I)	City of Cork Act 1791	An Act for continuing an Act passed in the Tenth Year of King George the First.	Section One.
31 Geo. 3. c. 25 (I)	Recognizances Act 1791	An Act to discharge such Recognizances entered into for the Appearance and Prosecution of Offenders.	Section One.
31 Geo. 3. c. 26 (I)	Corn Trade Act 1791	An Act to promote a reciprocal Preference between this Kingdom and Great Britain in the Corn Trade.	The whole act.
31 Geo. 3. c. 27 (I)	Tanning Act 1791	An Act to amend an Act passed in the Third Year of His present Majesty, entitled "An Act to prevent Frauds in the tanning of Hides, currying of Leather, and the making of Shoes and Boots."	The whole act.
31 Geo. 3. c. 28 (I)	Mutiny Act (Ireland) 1791	An Act for punishing Mutiny and Desertion, and for the better Payment of the Army and their Quarters within this Kingdom.	The whole act.
31 Geo. 3. c. 29 (I)	Salaries of Assistant Barristers Act 1791	An Act to amend the Laws respecting Assistant Barristers of the Sessions of the Peace.	The whole act.
31 Geo. 3. c. 30 (I)	Trials at Nisi Prius Act 1791	An Act for explaining and amending an Act, entitled "An Act for enlarging the Time for Trials by Nisi Prius in the City of Dublin, and county of Dublin."	The whole act.
31 Geo. 3. c. 32 (I)	Slander Act 1791	An Act to prevent vexatious Arrests, and proceedings in Actions of Slander.	The whole act.
31 Geo. 3. c. 36 (I)	Parliamentary Election Petitions Act 1791	An Act to amend and consolidate the several Acts relating to the Trials of Controverted Elections, or Returns of Members to serve in Parliament.	The whole act.
31 Geo. 3. c. 37 (I)	Indemnity Act (Ireland) 1791	An Act for the Relief of Persons who have omitted to qualify themselves according to Law.	The whole act.
31 Geo. 3. c. 41 (I)	Endowed Schools Commission Continuance Act 1791	An Act to continue an Act to continue an Act, entitled "An Act to continue an Act entitled 'An Act to enable the Lord Lieutenant.'"	The whole act.
31 Geo. 3. c. 42 (I)	Grand Canal Act 1791	An Act for directing the further Application of the Sum of Two hundred thousand Pounds, granted by an Act passed in the Twenty-ninth Year of His present Majesty, entitled "An Act for the Promotion and Encouragement of Inland Navigation."	Sections One, Two, Six, Seven, and Eight.
31 Geo. 3. c. 43 (I)	Dublin Horse Racing Act 1791	An Act to prohibit Horse Races in the Neighbourhood of the City of Dublin.	The whole act.
31 Geo. 3. c. 44 (I)	Expiring Laws Continuance Act 1791	An Act for reviving and continuing several temporary Statutes.	The whole act.
31 Geo. 3. c. 47 (I)	Inland Navigation Act 1791	An Act to enable the several Grand Juries within the Province of Munster.	Section One.
32 Geo. 3. c. 1 (I)	N/A	An Act for granting for one Year the several Duties therein mentioned in lieu of all other Duties.	The whole act.
32 Geo. 3. c. 2	N/A	An Act for securing the Payment of the Annuities, and of the Interest upon the Principal Sums.	The whole act.
32 Geo. 3. c. 3	N/A	An Act for further continuing an Act, entitled "An Act for facilitating the Trade and Intercourse between this Kingdom and the United States of America."	The whole act.
32 Geo. 3. c. 4	N/A	An Act for granting the Sum of Four thousand Pounds to the Trustees of the Linen and Hempen Manufacture, and for other Purposes.	The whole act.
32 Geo. 3. c. 5	N/A	An Act for regulating the Payment of Bounties on the Exportation of certain Manufactures of this Kingdom.	The whole act.
32 Geo. 3. c. 6	Charities Grants Act 1792	An Act for granting the several Sums therein mentioned, for certain pious and charitable Purposes.	The whole act.
32 Geo. 3. c. 7	N/A	An Act for regulating and extending the Tobacco Trade.	The whole act.
32 Geo. 3. c. 8	N/A	An Act for granting to His Majesty, His Heirs and Successors, several Duties therein mentioned, to be levied by the Commissioners for managing the Stamp Duties.	The whole act.
32 Geo. 3. c. 9	Mutiny Act (Ireland) 1792	An Act for punishing Mutiny and Desertion, and for the better payment of the Army and their Quarters within this Kingdom.	The whole act.
32 Geo. 3. c. 10	Postage Act 1792	An Act for granting to His Majesty, His Heirs and Successors, certain Duties and Rates upon the Portage and Conveyance of all Letters and Packets within this Kingdom.	The whole act.
32 Geo. 3. c. 11	Lotteries Act 1792	An Act to amend the Laws for the Sale and Insurance of Lottery Tickets.	Section One.
32 Geo. 3. c. 14	Dublin Society Act 1792	An Act for granting the Sum of Five thousand Pounds to the Dublin Society for the Purposes therein mentioned.	Sections One to Four.
32 Geo. 3. c. 15	Inland Navigation Act 1792	An Act to explain and amend certain Laws relative to Inland Navigations of this Kingdom.	Sections Three to Eight.
32 Geo. 3. c. 17	N/A	An Act for continuing and amending several Laws relating to His Majesty's Revenue, and for more effectually preventing Frauds therein.	The whole act.
32 Geo. 3. c. 18	King's Inns Act 1792	An Act for confirming the Powers.	The whole act.
32 Geo. 3. c. 19	Spirit Licences Act 1799	An Act for continuing and amending an Act, entitled "An Act for regulating the issuing of Licenses for the Sale of Spirituous Liquors by Retail, and for remedying the Abuses which have arisen from the immoderate use of such Liquors."	The whole act.
32 Geo. 3. c. 20	Corn Trade Act 1792	An Act for the encrease of Agriculture and Commerce, by establishing a reciprocal Preference in the Corn Trade between this Kingdom and Great Britain.	The whole act.
32 Geo. 3. c. 21	Roman Catholic Relief (Repeals) Act 1792	An Act to remove certain Restraints and Disabilities therein mentioned, to which His Majesty's Subjects professing the Popish Religion are now subject.	The whole act.
32 Geo. 3. c. 22	Roman Catholic Relief (Indemnity) Act 1792	An Act to indemnify such of His Majesty's Subjects professing the Popish Religion.	The whole act.
32 Geo. 3. c. 23	Sea Fisheries Act 1792	An Act for the further Encouragement of the Fisheries on the Coasts of this Kingdom.	The whole act.
32 Geo. 3. c. 27	N/A	An Act for the employing at Hard Labour Persons sentenced to be Transported.	The whole act.
32 Geo. 3. c. 28	N/A	An Act further to promote the building of new Churches.	The whole act.
32 Geo. 3. c. 30	Post Roads Act 1792	An Act for improving and keeping in repair the Post Roads of this Kingdom.	The whole act.
32 Geo. 3. c. 32	N/A	An Act to enable Aliens born out of the Allegiance of His Majesty, His Heirs and Successors, to take Lands, Tenements, and Hereditaments in this Kingdom by way of Mortgage, subject to certain Restrictions.	The whole act.
32 Geo. 3. c. 33	Indemnity Act (Ireland) 1792	An Act for the Relief of Persons who have omitted to qualify themselves according to Law.	The whole act.
32 Geo. 3. c. 40	Expiring Laws Continuance Act 1792	An Act for reviving and continuing certain temporary Statutes.	Sections One to Six.
33 Geo. 3. c. 1 (I)	Alien Act 1793	An Act for establishing Regulations respecting Aliens arriving in this Kingdom, or resident therein, in certain cases, and Subjects of this Kingdom who have served or are serving in Foreign Armies.	The whole act.
33 Geo. 3. c. 2 (I)	Gunpowder Act 1793	An Act to prevent the Importation of Arms, Gunpowder, and Ammunition into this Kingdom, and the removing and keeping of Gunpowder, Arms, and Ammunition without License.	The whole act.
33 Geo. 3. c. 3 (I)	Indemnity Act (Ireland) 1793	An Act for indemnifying such Persons as have acted for the Service of the Public.	The whole act.
33 Geo. 3. c. 4 (I)	N/A	An Act for granting for One Year the several Duties therein mentioned, in lieu of all other Duties.	The whole act.
33 Geo. 3. c. 5 (I)	N/A	An Act for securing the payment of the Annuities, and of the Interest upon the Principal Sums.	The whole act.
33 Geo. 3. c. 6 (I)	N/A	An Act for regulating the Allowance of the Drawback and Payment of the Bounty on the Exportation of Sugar.	The whole act.
33 Geo. 3. c. 7 (I)	Trade with United States Act 1793	An Act for further continuing an Act, entitled "An Act for facilitating the Trade and Intercourse between this Kingdom and the United States of America."	The whole act.
33 Geo. 3. c. 8 (I)	N/A	An Act for regulating the Payment of Bounties on the Exportation of certain Manufactures of this Kingdom.	The whole act.
33 Geo. 3. c. 9 (I)	Charities Grants Act 1793	An Act for granting the several Sums therein mentioned for certain pious and charitable Purposes.	The whole act.
33 Geo. 3. c. 11 (I)	Tobacco Act 1793	An Act for regulating and extending the Tobacco Trade.	The whole act.
33 Geo. 3. c. 13 (I)	Dublin Society Act 1793	An Act for granting the Sum of Five thousand Pounds to the Dublin Society for the purposes therein mentioned.	Sections One to Four.
33 Geo. 3. c. 14 (I)	N/A	An Act for granting to His Majesty, for One Year, the Duties therein mentioned on Fire-hearths, in lieu of all Duties payable on the same, prior to or during the said Term.	The whole act.
33 Geo. 3. c. 15 (I)	N/A	An Act for granting to His Majesty, His Heirs and Successors, several Duties therein mentioned, to be levied by the Commissioners for Managing the Stamp Duties.	The whole act.
33 Geo. 3. c. 16 (I)	Mutiny Act (Ireland) 1793	An Act for punishing Mutiny and Desertion, and for the better Payment of the Army and their Quarters within this Kingdom.	The whole act.
33 Geo. 3. c. 17 (I)	N/A	An Act for granting to His Majesty, His Heirs and Successors, certain Duties and Rates upon the Portage and Conveyance of all Letters and Packets within this Kingdom.	The whole act.
33 Geo. 3. c. 18 (I)	Lotteries Act 1793	An Act to prevent Insurance of Lottery Tickets, to regulate the Drawing of Lotteries, and to amend the Laws respecting the same.	Sections One to Seventeen. Sections Nineteen, Twenty, Twenty-two, Twenty-four, Twenty-five. Section Twenty-six from "in which no essoign" to the end of the Section. Sections Twenty-eight to Thirty-three.
33 Geo. 3. c. 21 (I)	Roman Catholic Relief Act 1793	An Act for the Relief of His Majesty's Popish or Roman Catholic Subjects of Ireland.	Sections One to Six. Sections Ten, Eleven, Thirteen.
33 Geo. 3. c. 23 (I)	N/A	An Act for the encouragement of Seamen and Marines employed in the Royal Navy.	The whole act.
33 Geo. 3. c. 25 (I)	N/A	An Act to encourage the improvement of barren Land.	The whole act.
33 Geo. 3. c. 30 (I)	N/A	An Act more effectually to prevent, during the present War between Great Britain and France, all traitorous Correspondence with, or Aid, or Assistance being given to, His Majesty's Enemies.	The whole act.
33 Geo. 3. c. 31 (I)	Trade between Ireland and East Indies Act 1793	An Act for regulating the Trade of Ireland, to and from the East Indies under certain Conditions and Provisions, for a Time therein mentioned.	The whole act.
33 Geo. 3. c. 33 (I)	N/A	An Act for defraying the Charges of the Pay and Clothing of the Militia for One Year, from the Twenty-fifth of March One thousand seven hundred and ninety-three, and for the more easily raising of the same.	The whole act.
33 Geo. 3. c. 34 (I)	Civil List Act 1793	An Act for the Support of the Honour and Dignity of His Majesty's Crown in Ireland, and for granting to His Majesty a Civil List Establishment, under certain Provisions and Regulations.	Sections One to Fourteen. Sections Sixteen and Seventeen.
33 Geo. 3. c. 36 (I)	Spirit Licences Act 1793	An Act for continuing the Duties granted to His Majesty on Licenses for the retail of Spirituous Liquors, and for continuing the Regulations for issuing such Licenses, and for remedying the Abuses which have arisen from the immoderate use of such Liquors.	The whole act.
33 Geo. 3. c. 37 (I)	N/A	An Act for continuing and amending the several Laws relating to His Majesty's Revenue, and for more effectually preventing Frauds therein.	The whole act.
33 Geo. 3. c. 38 (I)	N/A	An Act for giving Relief in proceedings upon Writs of Mandamus, for the admission of Freemen into Corporations.	The whole act.
33 Geo. 3. c. 39 (I)	N/A	An Act to enable His Excellency the Lord Lieutenant to issue Treasury Bills for raising the Sum of Three thousand Pounds.	The whole act.
33 Geo. 3. c. 41 (I)	House of Commons Disqualification Act 1793	An Act for securing the Freedom and Independence of the House of Commons.	Sections Three, Four, Five, and Seven. Section Nine from "wherein no essoign" to the end of the Section. Sections Ten and Eleven.
33 Geo. 3. c. 42 (I)	Relief of Insolvent Debtors Act 1793	An Act for the relief of Insolvent Debtors, in regard to the imprisonment of their Persons.	The whole act.
33 Geo. 3. c. 44 (I)	King's Inns Act 1793	An Act to repeal so much of an Act passed in the Thirty-second Year of His Majesty.	The whole act.
33 Geo. 3. c. 46 (I)	Post Roads Act 1793	An Act to amend and explain an Act passed in the Thirty-second Year of His present Majesty's Reign, entitled An Act for improving and keeping in repair the Post Roads of this Kingdom.	The whole act.
33 Geo. 3. c. 49 (I)	Forfeited Estates Act 1793	An Act for re-vesting in His Majesty the Estates forfeited in One thousand six hundred and eighty-eight, yet remaining unsold.	The whole act.
33 Geo. 3. c. 52 (I)	N/A	An Act for the advancement of Trade and Manufactures, by granting the Sums therein mentioned for the Support of commercial Credit.	The whole act.
33 Geo. 3. c. 55 (I)	Marine Mutiny Act (Ireland) 1793	An Act for the regulation of His Majesty's Marine Forces while on Shore.	The whole act.
34 Geo. 3. c. 1 (I)	Hearth Duty Act 1794	An Act for granting to His Majesty, for One Year, the Duties therein mentioned on Fire-hearths, in lieu of all Duties payable on the same, prior to, or during the said Term.	The whole act.
34 Geo. 3. c. 2 (I)	Postage Act 1794	An Act for granting to His Majesty, His Heirs and Successors, certain Duties and Rates upon the Portage and Conveyance of all Letters and Packets within this Kingdom.	The whole act.
34 Geo. 3. c. 3 (I)	Stamps Act (Ireland) 1794	An Act for granting to His Majesty, His Heirs and Successors, several Duties therein mentioned, to be levied by the Commissioners for managing the Stamp Duties.	The whole act.
34 Geo. 3. c. 4 (I)	N/A	An Act for securing the Payment of the Annuities, and of Interest upon the Principal Sums.	The whole act.
34 Geo. 3. c. 5 (I)	N/A	An Act for granting for One Year the several Duties therein mentioned, in lieu of all other Duties.	The whole act.
34 Geo. 3. c. 6 (I)	Building of Law Courts Act 1794	An Act for enabling the Lord High Chancellor of Ireland, and the Court of Exchequer respectively.	The whole act.
34 Geo. 3. c. 7 (I)	County Treasurers Act 1794	An Act to prevent the inconveniencies which may arise during the Vacancy of the Office of Treasurer of a County.	The whole act.
34 Geo. 3. c. 10 (I)	Revenue Act 1794	An Act for continuing and amending the several Laws relating to His Majesty's Revenue, and for the more effectually preventing Frauds therein, and for regulating and extending the Tobacco Trade of this Kingdom.	The whole act.
34 Geo. 3. c. 11 (I)	Spirit Licences Act 1794	An Act for continuing the several Laws relating to Licences for the Sale of Spirituous Liquors, and the Regulations for remedying the Abuses which have arisen from the immoderate use of such Liquors.	The whole act.
34 Geo. 3. c. 13 (I)	Militia Act (Ireland) 1794	An Act for defraying the charge of the Pay and Clothing of the Militia for One Year, from the Twenty-fifth of March One thousand seven hundred and ninety-four, and for the more easily raising the same.	The whole act.
34 Geo. 3. c. 14 (I)	Aiding the French Act 1794	An Act for preventing Money or Effects in the Hands of His Majesty's Subjects.	The whole act.
34 Geo. 3. c. 15 (I)	Dublin Society Act 1794	An Act for directing the application of the Sum of Five thousand five hundred Pounds.	Section One.
34 Geo. 3. c. 16 (I)	Expiring Laws Continuance (No. 2) Act 1794	An Act for continuing an Act passed last session of Parliament.	The whole act.
34 Geo. 3. c. 19 (I)	Mutiny Act (Ireland) 1794	An Act for punishing Mutiny and Desertion, and for the better Payment of the Army and their Quarters within this Kingdom.	The whole act.
34 Geo. 3. c. 21 (I)	Duties on Hides Act 1794	An Act for granting to His Majesty the Duties therein mentioned upon Hides and Skins, and Manufactures of Leather.	The whole act.
34 Geo. 3. c. 22 (I)	Roman Catholic Relief (Fees) Act 1794	An Act for ascertaining the Fees payable by such Roman Catholics as qualify.	The whole act.
34 Geo. 3. c. 23 (I)	Expiring Laws Continuance (No. 3) Act 1794	An Act for reviving and continuing certain temporary Statutes.	The whole act.
34 Geo. 3. c. 24 (I)	Trade with United States Act 1794	An Act for further continuing an Act, entitled, "An Act for facilitating the Trade and Intercourse between this Kingdom and the United States of America."	The whole act.
34 Geo. 3. c. 25 (I)	Export Bounties Act 1794	An Act for regulating the Payment of Bounties on the Exportation of certain Manufactures of this Kingdom.	The whole act.
35 Geo. 3. c. 1 (I)	Hearth Duty Act 1795	An Act for granting to His Majesty, for One Year, the Duties therein mentioned on Fire-Hearths, in lieu of all Duties payable on the same prior to, or during the said Term.	The whole act.
35 Geo. 3. c. 3 (I)	N/A	An Act for granting to His Majesty the Duties therein mentioned upon Hides and Skins, and Manufactures of Leather.	The whole act.
35 Geo. 3. c. 4 (I)	N/A	An Act for granting for One Year the several Duties therein mentioned in lieu of all other Duties.	The whole act.
35 Geo. 3. c. 5 (I)	Militia Act (Ireland) 1795	An Act for defraying the Charges of the Pay and Clothing of the Militia for One Year, from the Twenty-fifth day of March One thousand seven hundred and ninety-five.	The whole act.
35 Geo. 3. c. 6 (I)	National Debt Act (Ireland) 1795	An Act for securing the Payment of the Annuities, and of the Principal Sums.	The whole act.
35 Geo. 3. c. 7 (I)	Grand Jury Presentments Act 1795	An Act for the Regulation of Presentments, for the Purpose of Levying Money to be expended in erecting Court-houses, Gaols, and other expensive Buildings.	The whole act.
35 Geo. 3. c. 9 (I)	Stamp Act 1795	An Act for granting to His Majesty, His Heirs and Successors, several Duties therein mentioned, to be levied by the Commissioners for Managing the Stamp Duties.	The whole act.
35 Geo. 3. c. 10 (I)	Trade with the United States Act 1795	An Act for continuing an Act, entitled, "An Act for facilitating the Trade and Intercourse between this Kingdom and the United States of America."	The whole act.
35 Geo. 3. c. 11 (I)	Postage Act 1795	An Act for granting to His Majesty, His Heirs and Successors, certain Duties and Rates upon the Portage and Conveyance of all Letters and Packets within this Kingdom.	The whole act.
35 Geo. 3. c. 13 (I)	Indemnity Act (Ireland) 1795	An Act for indemnifying such Persons as have acted for the Service of the Public.	The whole act.
35 Geo. 3. c. 14 (I)	Mutiny Act (Ireland) 1795	An Act for punishing Mutiny and Desertion, and for the better Payment of the Army and their Quarters within this Kingdom.	The whole act.
35 Geo. 3. c. 15 (I)	Export Bounties Act 1795	An Act for regulating the Payment of Bounties on the Exportation of certain Manufactures of this Kingdom.	The whole act.
35 Geo. 3. c. 18 (I)	Audit of Public Accounts Act 1795	An Act for auditing and settling certain Accounts now remaining Unsettled at His Majesty's Treasury.	The whole act.
35 Geo. 3. c. 19 (I)	Brewers Act 1795	An Act for repealing the several Regulations which affect the Trade of a Brewer, in this Kingdom.	The whole act.
35 Geo. 3. c. 20 (I)	Spirit Licences Act 1795	An Act for continuing an Act, entitled, "An Act for continuing the several Laws relating to Licences for the Sale of Spirituous Liquors, and the Regulations for remedying the Abuses which have arisen from the immoderate use of such Liquors."	The whole act.
35 Geo. 3. c. 21 (I)	Maynooth College Act 1795	An Act for the better Education of Persons professing the Popish, or Roman Catholic Religion.	Section One to "Thomas Hussey, of the City of Dublin, Doctor in Divinity, and", and from "and to purchase and acquire Lands" to the End of the Section. Sections Two, Four, and Five. Section Six to "shall seem Expedient; and," and from "so assembled" to "of the Trustees." Sections Eight to Eleven.
35 Geo. 3. c. 22 (I)	School of Physic Act 1795	An Act to explain an Act, entitled, "An Act for establishing a complete School of Physick in this Kingdom."	The whole act.
35 Geo. 3. c. 23 (I)	Ecclesiastical Lands Act 1795	An Act to explain and amend an Act passed in the Tenth and Eleventh Years of the Reign of King Charles the First, entitled, "An Act for preservation of the Inheritance, Rights, and Profits of Lands belonging to the Church and Persons Ecclesiastical."	Section Two to "Leases did amount unto."
35 Geo. 3. c. 24 (I)	Expiring Laws Continuance Act 1795	An Act for continuing an Act, passed in the Thirty-third Year of His Majesty's Reign.	The whole act.
35 Geo. 3. c. 26 (I)	N/A	An Act to prevent the Exportation of Starch under certain conditions.	The whole act.
35 Geo. 3. c. 27 (I)	N/A	An Act for the Preservation of the Publick Roads in this Kingdom, and for the encouragement of Broad-wheeled Carriages.	The whole act.
35 Geo. 3. c. 28 (I)	Collection of Revenue Act 1795	An Act for the better regulation of the Receipts and Issues of His Majesty's Treasury.	Sections One to Four. Section Seven. Section Eight to "week out of the said revenues." Sections Nine and Ten. Section Eleven from "in which no essoign," to the end of the Section. Sections Fourteen to Twenty. Sections Twenty-six to Thirty-four.
35 Geo. 3. c. 29 (I)	Parliamentary Elections Act 1795	An Act for regulating the Election of Members to serve in Parliament, and for repealing the several Acts therein mentioned.	Section One. Section Two from "on such day" to the end of the Section. Sections Four, Twenty-one. Section Twenty-five, from "nor by virtue of any Freehold" to the end of the section. Section Twenty-seven. Sections Twenty-nine to Fifty-nine. Sections Sixty-one to Seventy-one. Section Seventy-two from "and that any Person" to the end of the Section. Section Seventy-three. Sections Seventy-nine to Eighty-one.
35 Geo. 3. c. 30 (I)	Insolvent Debtors Relief Act 1795	An Act for the relief of insolvent Debtors, in regard to the imprisonment of their Persons.	The whole act.
35 Geo. 3. c. 32 (I)	Tithes Act 1795	An Act to explain an Act passed in the Seventh Year of the Reign of His present Majesty.	The whole act.
35 Geo. 3. c. 33 (I)	Fisheries Act 1795	An Act to continue for One Year several Acts for the encouragement of the Fisheries on the Coasts of this Kingdom.	The whole act.
35 Geo. 3. c. 35 (I)	Lotteries Act 1795	An Act for amending the Laws for the Regulation of Lottery Offices, and for preventing the insurance of Lottery Tickets.	The whole act.
35 Geo. 3. c. 36 (I)	Dublin Police Act 1795	An Act for more effectually preserving the Peace within the City of Dublin and the District of the Metropolis, and establishing a Parochial Watch in the said City.	Section Eighty-four to "theretofore passed; and". Section Ninety-four.
35 Geo. 3. c. 37 (I)	Exchequer Bills Act 1795	An Act for raising the Sum therein mentioned to defray such extraordinary Expenses as may be necessarily incurred for the Service of the present Year.	The whole act.
35 Geo. 3. c. 38 (I)	Post Roads Act 1795	An Act for further improving the Post Roads in this Kingdom.	The whole act.
35 Geo. 3. c. 39 (I)	N/A	An Act for confirming Grants made by Patents under the Great Seal of England.	The whole act.
35 Geo. 3. c. 40 (I)	Indemnity Act (Ireland) (No. 2) 1795	An Act for the relief of Persons who have omitted to qualify themselves according to Law.	The whole act.
35 Geo. 3. c. 41 (I)	Revenue Act 1795	An Act for continuing and amending the several Laws relating to His Majesty's Revenue, and further preventing Frauds therein.	The whole act.
35 Geo. 3. c. 42 (I)	Assize of Bread Act 1795	An Act for regulating the Baking Trade.	The whole act.
35 Geo. 3. c. 45 (I)	Speaker of the House of Commons Act 1795	An Act that the acceptance of the Office of a Lord Justice, or Chief Governor of this Kingdom by the Speaker of the House of Commons, shall not vacate his Seat in Parliament.	The whole act.
35 Geo. 3. c. 46 (I)	Supply of Copies of Statutes Act 1795	An Act for the better promulgating the Statute Law of this Kingdom.	The whole act.
36 Geo. 3. c. 1 (I)	National Debt Act (Ireland) 1796	An Act for securing the Payment of the Annuities, and of the Interest upon the principal Sums.	Except Section Six.
36 Geo. 3. c. 2	Duties and Bounties Act 1796	An Act for granting for One Year the several Duties therein mentioned, in lieu of all other Duties.	The whole act.
36 Geo. 3. c. 3	Export Bounties Act 1796	An Act for regulating the payment of Bounties on the Exportation of certain Manufactures of this Kingdom.	The whole act.
36 Geo. 3. c. 5	Trade with the United States Act 1796	An Act for further continuing an Act entitled "An Act for facilitating the Trade and Intercourse between this Kingdom and the United States of America."	The whole act.
36 Geo. 3. c. 6	Indemnity Act (Ireland) 1796	An Act for indemnifying such Persons as have acted since the First Day of January One thousand seven hundred and ninety-five for the preservation of the public Peace and suppression of the Insurrections prevailing in some Parts of this Kingdom.	The whole act.
36 Geo. 3. c. 8	N/A	An Act to enable the Lord Lieutenant and Council to prohibit the Export of Corn, Grain, Meal, Malt, Flour, Bread, Biscuit, Peas, Beans, Potatoes, Starch, and Hair Powder, for a limited Time.	The whole act.
36 Geo. 3. c. 9	County Infirmaries Act 1796	An Act for the further Regulation of public Infirmaries or Hospitals.	The whole act.
36 Geo. 3. c. 10	Duties on Hides Act 1796	An Act for granting unto His Majesty the Duties therein mentioned upon Hides and Skins and Manufactures of Leather.	The whole act.
36 Geo. 3. c. 11	Postage Act (Ireland) 1796	An Act for granting to His Majesty, His Heirs and Successors, certain Duties and Rates upon the Portage and Conveyance of all Letters and Packets within this Kingdom.	The whole act.
36 Geo. 3. c. 12	County Treasurers Act 1796	An Act to amend an Act passed in the Thirteenth and Fourteenth Years of King George the Third.	Except Section Four.
36 Geo. 3. c. 14	Mutiny Act (Ireland) 1796	An Act for punishing Mutiny and Desertion, and for the better Payment of the Army and their Quarters within this Kingdom.	The whole act.
36 Geo. 3. c. 15	Hearth Duty Act 1796	An Act for granting to His Majesty for One Year the Duties therein mentioned on Fire-hearths, in lieu of all Duties payable on the same during the said Term.	The whole act.
36 Geo. 3. c. 16	Grants for Agriculture, &c. Act 1796	An Act for directing the Application of the Sum of Five thousand five hundred Pounds granted by Parliament to the Dublin Society for the Improvement of Husbandry and other useful Arts.	The whole act.
36 Geo. 3. c. 17	Stamp Act 1796	An Act for granting to His Majesty, His Heirs and Successors, several Duties therein mentioned, to be levied by the Commissioners for Managing the Stamp Duties.	The whole act.
36 Geo. 3. c. 18	Lighthouses Act 1796	An Act to empower the Commissioners of His Majesty's Revenue, with the approbation of the Lord Lieutenant, to erect Lighthouses around the Coasts of this Kingdom, and to levy a Tonnage Duty on all Shipping.	The whole act.
36 Geo. 3. c. 19	Tallow Exportation Act 1796	An Act to prohibit the Exportation of Candles, Tallow, and Soap for a limited Time, except to His Majesty's Dominions.	The whole act.
36 Geo. 3. c. 21	Sugar Act 1796	An Act for the Reduction of Drawbacks and Bounties now allowed on the Exportation of Sugar.	The whole act.
36 Geo. 3. c. 22	Sites for Barracks Act 1796	An Act for rendering more effectual the several Laws heretofore made for the government and regulation of the Barracks and other Public Works in this Kingdom.	The whole act.
36 Geo. 3. c. 23	Municipal Elections Act 1796	An Act to amend certain Rules, Orders, and Directions made by the Lord Lieutenant.	The whole act.
36 Geo. 3. c. 24	Militia Act (Ireland) 1796	An Act for defraying the Charge of the Pay and Clothing of the Militia for One Year, from the Twenty-fifth Day of March One thousand seven hundred and ninety-six.	The whole act.
36 Geo. 3. c. 26	N/A	An Act for encreasing the Salaries of the Chief Justices and other Judges of His Majesty's Courts of King's Bench and Common Pleas, and of the Chief Baron and other Barons of the Court of Exchequer in this Kingdom.	Except Section Five.
36 Geo. 3. c. 28	N/A	An Act to empower Millers, Maltsters, Brewers, and Distillers bringing Corn and Malt.	The whole act.
36 Geo. 3. c. 31	Treason by Women Act (Ireland) 1796	An Act for discontinuing the Judgment which has been required by Law to be given against Women convicted of certain Crimes, and substituting another Judgment in lieu thereof.	Section Three.
36 Geo. 3. c. 34	Expiring Laws Continuance Act 1796	An Act to make perpetual the Laws for preventing Frauds committed by Bankrupts; also an Act for providing a Maintenance for Parish Clerks, and for continuing certain other temporary Statutes.	The whole act.
36 Geo. 3. c. 36	Repair of Roads Act 1796	An Act for the more effectually keeping the Public Roads in repair by Contract.	The whole act.
36 Geo. 3. c. 38	Distress Act 1796	An Act to prevent vexatious Replevins of Distresses taken for Rent.	The words "provided the assignment be duly stamped before any action be brought thereupon."
36 Geo. 3. c. 39	Inferior Courts Act 1796	An Act to limit the Jurisdiction of Sheriffs in their County Courts, and of other inferior Courts.	The whole act.
36 Geo. 3. c. 40	Spirit Licences Act 1796	An Act for regulating the issuing of Licenses for the Sale of Spirituous Liquors by retail, and for remedying the Abuses which have arisen from the immoderate Use of such Liquors.	The whole act.
36 Geo. 3. c. 41	N/A	An Act to enable Guardians of Minors to demise or sell Grounds, the Property of such Minors, for the purpose of having Court-houses or Gaols built thereon.	The whole act.
36 Geo. 3. c. 42	Arms Act 1796	An Act to prevent the Importation of Arms, Gunpowder, and Ammunition into this Kingdom, and the making, removing, selling, and keeping of Gunpowder, Arms, and Ammunition without License.	The whole act.
36 Geo. 3. c. 43	N/A	An Act to enable the Lord Lieutenant or Chief Governor or Governors for the Time being and Council, when the Price of Corn or Grain is above the Rates of Exportation, to prohibit the Export of Bread and Biscuit, and to indemnify those who have prevented the Export of the same.	The whole act.
36 Geo. 3. c. 46	Indemnity (No. 2) Act (Ireland) 1796	An Act for the relief of Persons who have omitted to qualify themselves according to Law.	The whole act.
36 Geo. 3. c. 49	Exchequer Bills Act (Ireland) 1796	An Act for raising the Sum therein mentioned, to defray any extraordinary Expences which may be incurred for the Publick Service for the Year to end at Lady Day One thousand seven hundred and ninety-seven.	The whole act.
36 Geo. 3. c. 53	Earl of Athlone's Annuity Act 1796	An Act to enable His Majesty to grant a certain Annuity.	The whole act.
36 Geo. 3. c. 55	Highways Act 1796	An Act for the amendment of Publick Roads, for directing the Power of Grand Juries respecting Presentments, and for repealing several Laws heretofore made for those Purposes.	The whole act.
36 Geo. 3. c. 56	Navy Pay and Pensions Act 1796	An Act for establishing an easy and expeditious Method for the Payment in this Kingdom of Half-pay to certain Naval Officers.	The whole act.
36 Geo. 3. c. 57	Canal Bridges Act 1796	An Act for the further improving and carrying on of Inland Navigations, not being in the whole or in any part private Property, and for regulating the Mode of building Bridges on Highways where the same are intersected by any Canal.	Except Sections Seven and Eight.
37 Geo. 3. c. 1 (I)	Habeas Corpus Suspension Act 1797	An Act to empower the Lord Lieutenant, or other Chief Governor or Governors of Ireland, to apprehend and detain such Persons as he or they shall suspect of conspiring against His Majesty's Person and Government.	The whole act.
37 Geo. 3. c. 2 (I)	Volunteers Act 1797	An Act for encouraging and disciplining such Corps of Men as shall voluntarily enroll themselves under Officers to be commissioned by His Majesty for the Defence of this Kingdom during the present War.	The whole act.
37 Geo. 3. c. 3 (I)	N/A	An Act for granting for One Year the several Duties therein mentioned in lieu of all other Duties.	The whole act.
37 Geo. 3. c. 4 (I)	National Debt Act (Ireland) 1797	An Act for securing the Payment of the Annuities, and of the Interest upon the Principal Sums.	The whole act.
37 Geo. 3. c. 5 (I)	Bounties Act 1797	An Act for regulating the Payment of Bounties on the Exportation of certain Manufactures of this Kingdom.	The whole act.
37 Geo. 3. c. 6 (I)	Sugar Act 1797	An Act for the Reduction of Drawbacks and Bounties now allowed on the Exportation of Sugar.	The whole act.
37 Geo. 3. c. 7 (I)	Militia Act (Ireland) 1797	An Act for defraying the Charge of the Pay and Clothing of the Militia for One Year from the Twenty-fifth day of March One thousand seven hundred and ninety-seven.	The whole act.
37 Geo. 3. c. 8 (I)	Leather Act 1797	An Act granting to His Majesty the Duties therein mentioned upon Hides and Skins and Manufactures of Leather.	The whole act.
37 Geo. 3. c. 9 (I)	Hearth Duty Act 1797	An Act for granting to His Majesty for One Year the Duties therein mentioned on Fire-hearths, in lieu of all Duties payable on the same during the said Term.	The whole act.
37 Geo. 3. c. 10 (I)	N/A	An Act to enable certain Inhabitants of the County of Armagh who have been injured in their Persons or Properties to recover Compensation for such Injuries by Presentment, notwithstanding the Time by Law prescribed for applying for such Presentments be lapsed.	The whole act.
37 Geo. 3. c. 11 (I)	Postage Act 1797	An Act for granting to His Majesty, His Heirs and Successors, certain Duties and Rates upon the portage and conveyance of all Letters and Packets within this Kingdom.	The whole act.
37 Geo. 3. c. 12 (I)	Stamps Act (Ireland) 1797	An Act for granting to His Majesty, His Heirs and Successors, several Duties therein mentioned, to be levied by the Commissioners for managing the Stamp Duties.	The whole act.
37 Geo. 3. c. 13 (I)	Mutiny Act (Ireland) 1797	An Act for punishing Mutiny and Desertion, and for the better Payment of the Army and their Quarters within this Kingdom.	The whole act.
37 Geo. 3. c. 14 (I)	Sugar Duty Act 1797	An Act to prevent the excessive Price of Refined Sugar in this Kingdom.	The whole act.
37 Geo. 3. c. 15 (I)	Trade with the United States Act 1797	An Act for further continuing an Act entitled "An Act for facilitating the Trade and Intercourse between this Kingdom and the United States of America."	The whole act.
37 Geo. 3. c. 16 (I)	Distillers Act 1797	An Act for regulating the Trade of a Distiller, and for securing the Duties payable on Home-made Spirits.	The whole act.
37 Geo. 3. c. 17 (I)	N/A	An Act to enable the Lords Commissioners of His Majesty's Treasury to conduct the working of a Gold Mine in the County of Wicklow, and for securing the Profits thereof.	The whole act.
37 Geo. 3. c. 18 (I)	N/A	An Act to prevent Exactions upon the Sale of Salt.	The whole act.
37 Geo. 3. c. 20 (I)	N/A	An Act for making Allowances in certain cases to Subaltern Officers of the Militia in Time of Peace.	The whole act.
37 Geo. 3. c. 21 (I)	N/A	An Act to amend the Game Laws.	Section One. Section Two, so far as relates to the Application of Penalties.
37 Geo. 3. c. 23 (I)	Grand Jury Presentments Act 1797	An Act to extend to Presentments exceeding Two hundred Pounds to be expended on Mail Coach Roads.	The whole act.
37 Geo. 3. c. 24 (I)	Corn Bounties Act 1797	An Act for the further Advancement of Agriculture, and promoting a steady Supply of Corn for the City of Dublin, by extending the Export Bounties on Corn and Flour to the said City, and discontinuing all Inland, Canal, and Coast Bounties thereto.	The whole act.
37 Geo. 3. c. 27 (I)	National Debt (No. 2) Act (Ireland) 1797	An Act for vesting a certain Fund in Commissioners at the end of every Quarter of a Year, to be by them applied to the reduction of the National Debt, and to direct the application of additional Funds, in case of future Loans, to the like Purpose.	The whole act.
37 Geo. 3. c. 28 (I)	Duties, &c. Act 1797	An Act for granting to His Majesty a Duty on Auctions.	The whole act.
37 Geo. 3. c. 31 (I)	Importation During the War Act 1797	An Act for the more secure Importation during a limited Time of the several Goods and Materials of Manufacture therein mentioned.	The whole act.
37 Geo. 3. c. 32 (I)	National Debt (No. 3) Act (Ireland) 1797	An Act for raising by Loan the several Sums therein mentioned towards the Supply granted to His Majesty.	The whole act.
37 Geo. 3. c. 33 (I)	Malt Act 1797	An Act for collecting and securing His Majesty's Revenue upon Malt.	The whole act.
37 Geo. 3. c. 35 (I)	Highways Act 1797	An Act to amend an Act passed in the Thirty-sixth Year of His present Majesty's Reign.	The whole act.
37 Geo. 3. c. 36 (I)	Trespass of Cattle Act 1797	An Act to prevent the vexatious Impounding of Cattle for Trespass or Damage-feasant, and for the more effectual Preserving of Mears and Fences.	The whole act.
37 Geo. 3. c. 37 (I)	Chapels of Ease Act 1797	An Act for amending an Act passed in this Kingdom in the Eleventh and Twelfth Years of His present Majesty.	The whole act.
37 Geo. 3. c. 39 (I)	N/A	An Act for indemnifying such Persons as have acted since the First Day of January One thousand seven hundred and ninety-seven for the Preservation of the Public Peace and Suppression of the Insurrections prevailing in some Parts of this Kingdom.	The whole act.
37 Geo. 3. c. 40 (I)	Incitement to Disaffection Act (Ireland) 1797	An Act for the better Prevention and Punishment of Attempts to seduce Persons serving in His Majesty's Forces by Sea or Land from their Duty and Allegiance to His Majesty, or to incite them to Mutiny or Disobedience.	Section Four.
37 Geo. 3. c. 41 (I)	Dublin Society Act 1797	An Act for directing the Application of the Sum of Five thousand five hundred Pounds, granted by Parliament to the Dublin Society, for the Improvement of Husbandry and other useful Arts.	The whole act.
37 Geo. 3. c. 43 (I)	Stamp Act (Ireland) 1797	An Act for the Relief of Persons who have omitted, or may omit, inadvertently, to pay certain Stamp Duties herein mentioned, on Deeds or other Instruments, and for ascertaining the Duty payable on Hats imported into this Kingdom.	The whole act.
37 Geo. 3. c. 44 (I)	Parish Estates Act 1797	An Act for the Preservation of Estates belonging to Parishes.	The whole act.
37 Geo. 3. c. 46 (I)	Distillers Act 1797	An Act to regulate the Trade of Rectifying of Spirits, and to subject Distillers to certain Regulations therein mentioned.	The whole act.
37 Geo. 3. c. 47 (I)	Parliamentary Elections Act 1797	An Act for the further Regulation of the Election of Members to serve in Parliament.	Except Section Twenty.
37 Geo. 3. c. 48 (I)	Relief of Insolvent Debtors Act (Ireland) 1797	An Act for the Relief of Confined Debtors who may be Insolvent.	The whole act.
37 Geo. 3. c. 50 (I)	Bank of Ireland Act 1797	An Act for further extending the Provisions of an Act passed in the Twenty-first and Twenty-second Years of His Majesty's Reign, entitled "An Act for establishing a Bank by the Name of the Governor and Company of the Bank of Ireland."	Section One to "Seventeenth day of February following." Sections Three and Four. Sections Six to Eleven.
37 Geo. 3. c. 51 (I)	Restriction on Cash Payments (Ireland) Act 1797	An Act for confirming and continuing for a limited Time the Restrictions contained in the Minute of Council of the Second Day of March One thousand seven hundred and ninety-seven, on Payments in Cash by the Bank.	The whole act.
37 Geo. 3. c. 52 (I)	Coffee Act 1797	An Act for regulating the Import, Export, and Sale of Coffee, and securing the Duties payable thereupon.	The whole act.
37 Geo. 3. c. 53 (I)	N/A	An Act to regulate the Export, Import, and Sale of certain Articles therein mentioned.	The whole act.
37 Geo. 3. c. 54 (I)	National Debt (No. 4) Act (Ireland) 1797	An Act to enable the Proprietors of Debentures issued by Government to convert them into Stock transferable at the Bank of Ireland.	Sections One to Ten.
37 Geo. 3. c. 57 (I)	Indemnity Act (Ireland) 1797	An Act for the Relief of Persons who have omitted to qualify themselves according to Law.	The whole act.
37 Geo. 3. c. 58 (I)	Dublin Hackney Carriages Act 1797	An Act for amending and reducing into One Act of Parliament the Laws relating to Hackney and other Carriages plying in the City of Dublin, its Suburbs and Liberties, and within Seven Miles thereof.	Section One.
37 Geo. 3. c. 59 (I)	Dublin Wide Streets Act 1797	An Act for granting to the Commissioners for making wide and convenient Streets in Dublin the Sums therein mentioned, for the Purposes therein mentioned.	The whole act.
37 Geo. 3. c. 60 (I)	Annuity for the Princess Royal Act 1797	An Act to enable His Majesty to grant a certain Pension to the Princess Royal upon Her intended Marriage with the Hereditary Prince of Wirtemburgh.	The whole act.
37 Geo. 3. c. 62 (I)	N/A	An Act to enable His Majesty to grant an Annuity to certain Trustees therein named, in Trust for Sarah Hamilton, Widow of the Reverend Doctor William Hamilton, deceased, and for the Children of the said Sarah by the said William Hamilton.	The whole act.
37 Geo. 3. c. 63 (I)	N/A	An Act to enable His Majesty to grant an Annuity to certain Trustees therein named, in Trust for Alicia Knipe, Widow of the Reverend George Knipe, deceased, and for the Children of the said George Knipe, namely, John, George, Frances, and Anne.	The whole act.
38 Geo. 3. c. 1 (I)	Militia Act (Ireland) 1798	An Act for defraying the Charge of the Pay and Clothing of the Militia for One Year from the Twenty-fifth Day of March One thousand seven hundred and ninety-eight.	The whole act.
38 Geo. 3. c. 3	Tyrone Presentments Act 1798	An Act to repeal so much of an Act passed in the Thirty-sixth Year of His present Majesty's Reign.	The whole act.
38 Geo. 3. c. 4	Portuguese Salt Act 1798	An Act to permit the Importation of Portugal Salt into this Kingdom, in Neutral Vessels, for a Time therein limited.	The whole act.
38 Geo. 3. c. 5	N/A	An Act for granting for One Year the several Duties therein mentioned, in lieu of all other Duties.	The whole act.
38 Geo. 3. c. 6	Bounties on Exportation Act 1798	An Act for regulating the Payment of Bounties on the Exportation of certain Manufactures of this Kingdom.	The whole act.
38 Geo. 3. c. 8	Incitement to Disaffection Act (Ireland) 1798	An Act to continue an Act passed in the Thirty-seventh Year of His Majesty's Reign.	The whole act.
38 Geo. 3. c. 9	Hearth Duty Act 1798	An Act for granting to His Majesty for One Year the Duties therein mentioned on Fire-hearths, in lieu of all Duties payable on the same during the said Term.	The whole act.
38 Geo. 3. c. 10	National Debt Act 1798	An Act for securing the Payment of the Annuities, and of the Interest upon the principal Sums.	The whole act.
38 Geo. 3. c. 11	Malt Duty Act 1798	An Act to continue an Act passed in the Thirty-seventh Year of His Majesty's Reign, entitled "An Act for collecting and securing His Majesty's Revenue upon Malt."	The whole act.
38 Geo. 3. c. 12	Coffee Duty Act 1798	An Act to continue an Act passed in the Thirty-seventh Year of His Majesty's Reign, entitled "An Act for regulating the Import, Export, and Sale of Coffee, and securing the Duties payable thereon."	The whole act.
38 Geo. 3. c. 13	Trade with the United States Act 1798	An Act for further continuing an Act entitled "An Act for facilitating the Trade and Intercourse between this Kingdom and the United States of America."	The whole act.
38 Geo. 3. c. 14	Habease Corpus Suspension Act 1798	An Act for continuing an Act passed in the Thirty-seventh Year of His Majesty's Reign.	The whole act.
38 Geo. 3. c. 15	Postage Act 1798	An Act for granting to His Majesty, His Heirs and Successors, certain Duties and Rates upon the Portage and Conveyance of all Letters and Packets within this Kingdom.	The whole act.
38 Geo. 3. c. 16	Alien Act Continuance Act 1798	An Act for continuing an Act passed in the Thirty-third Year of His Majesty's Reign.	The whole act.
38 Geo. 3. c. 17	Voluntary Contributions Act 1798	An Act to enable His Majesty to receive Voluntary Contributions of His Subjects for the Defence of this Kingdom.	The whole act.
38 Geo. 3. c. 18	Stamp Act (Ireland) 1798	An Act for granting to His Majesty, His Heirs and Successors, several Duties therein mentioned, to be levied by the Commissioners for managing the Stamp Duties.	The whole act.
38 Geo. 3. c. 19	Indemnity Act (Ireland) 1798	An Act for indemnifying such Persons as have acted since the Third Day of July in the Year One thousand seven (Note: Sic.) and ninety-seven for the Preservation of the Publick Peace and Suppression of the Insurrections prevailing in some Parts of this Kingdom.	The whole act.
38 Geo. 3. c. 20	Demise of the Crown Act 1798	An Act to shorten the Time now required for giving Notice of the Royal Intention, in case of a Demise of the Crown.	The whole act.
38 Geo. 3. c. 23	Leather Trade Act 1798	An Act for granting to His Majesty the Duties therein mentioned upon Hides and Skins tanned, and on Hides and Skins dressed in Oil, and upon Vellum and Parchment, and upon Manufactures of Leather.	The whole act.
38 Geo. 3. c. 24	Auctions, &c. Act 1798	An Act to secure the Collection of the Duties on Auctions, and on Glass Bottles made in this Kingdom, and on paper printed, painted, or stained in this Kingdom, to serve for Hangings or other uses, and to prevent Frauds therein.	The whole act.
38 Geo. 3. c. 26	N/A	An Act to empower the Justices of Oyer and Terminer and Gaol Delivery for the County of Dublin, Persons in Execution to attend before them as Witnesses.	Section One.
38 Geo. 3. c. 27	Mutiny Act (Ireland) 1798	An Act for punishing Mutiny and Desertion, and for the better Payment of the Army and their Quarters within this Kingdom.	The whole act.
38 Geo. 3. c. 30	Princess Royal's Pension (British Currency) Act 1798	An Act to amend an Act passed the last Session of Parliament, entitled "An Act to (Note: Sic.) entitle His Majesty to grant a certain Pension to the Princess Royal upon Her intended Marriage with the Hereditary Prince of Wirtemburgh."	The whole act.
38 Geo. 3. c. 32	N/A	An Act for raising by Loan, as a Supply to His Majesty, the Sums therein mentioned, for the purposes therein mentioned.	The whole act.
38 Geo. 3. c. 33	N/A	An Act for raising by Loan a Sum not exceeding Two hundred thousand and eighty Pounds, One thousand seven hundred and ninety-eight, and for other Purposes.	The whole act.
38 Geo. 3. c. 35	Dublin Workhouse, &c. Act 1798	An Act for the better Management of the Workhouse and Foundling Hospital in Dublin.	The whole act.
38 Geo. 3. c. 37	N/A	An Act to make Provision for quartering such Foreign Troops as His Majesty may think proper to employ in this Kingdom for the Defence thereof.	The whole act.
38 Geo. 3. c. 38	N/A	An Act to enable Commissioners of Oyer and Terminer and Gaol Delivery in and for the County and County of the City of Dublin to commence, hold, and continue their Sessions during the Term.	The whole act.
38 Geo. 3. c. 42	Sugar Act 1798	An Act for the Reduction of Drawbacks and Bounties now allowed on the Exportation of Sugar, and to prevent the excessive Price of Refined Sugar in this Kingdom.	The whole act.
38 Geo. 3. c. 43	Dublin Society Act 1798	An Act for directing the Application of the Sum of Five thousand five hundred Pounds, granted by Parliament to the Dublin Society, for the Improvement of Husbandry and other useful Arts.	The whole act.
38 Geo. 3. c. 45	N/A	An Act to regulate the Collection of the Duties on Male Servants, and to secure the Payment thereof, and for the better Collection of the Duties on Fire-hearths and on Coaches and other Carriages.	The whole act.
38 Geo. 3. c. 46	English Militia Act 1798	An Act for the Government of the Militia of Great Britain serving in this Kingdom during their continuance therein.	The whole act.
38 Geo. 3. c. 48	N/A	An Act for preventing the Desertion of Seamen from Ships trading between this Kingdom and His Majesty's Colonies and Plantations in the West Indies.	The whole act.
38 Geo. 3. c. 52	Rectifying of Spirits Act 1798	An Act to regulate the Trade of rectifying Spirits, and to prevent Frauds on His Majesty's Revenue by Rectifiers of Spirits.	The whole act.
38 Geo. 3. c. 55	General Pardon Act 1798	An Act for the King's Most Gracious general and free Pardon.	The whole act.
38 Geo. 3. c. 56	Public Accounts Act 1798	An Act for the better Regulation and Examination of Publick Accounts.	Sections One and Three.
38 Geo. 3. c. 58	English Loan Act 1798	An Act to enable the Commissioners of the Treasury in Ireland, Thousand Pounds British Currency therein mentioned.	The whole act.
38 Geo. 3. c. 59	Transportation Act 1798	An Act to remove Doubts respecting the Property in the Service of Persons transported from this Kingdom.	The whole act.
38 Geo. 3. c. 60	Corporations Act 1798	An Act for quieting Corporations.	The whole act.
38 Geo. 3. c. 61	N/A	An Act for better enforcing the Execution of the Act made for the Trial of controverted Elections of Members to serve in Parliament, by disqualifying certain Persons who have endeavoured to obstruct the due Execution thereof from Voting at any Election hereafter.	The whole act.
38 Geo. 3. c. 63	Tobacco Trade Act 1798	An Act to continue an Act passed in the Thirty-seventh Year of His Majesty's Reign, entitled "An Act for regulating and extending the Tobacco Trade, and for securing the Duties payable upon the Import and Manufacture of Tobacco."	The whole act.
38 Geo. 3. c. 64	Dublin Foundling Hospital Act 1798	An Act to authorize the Issuing and Payment of the Sum of Five thousand Pounds, granted as a further supply to the Foundling Hospital and Workhouse in the City of Dublin.	The whole act.
38 Geo. 3. c. 66	Annuity for Robert Boyd Act 1798	An Act to enable His Majesty to grant an Annuity of One thousand six hundred Pounds per Annum, to Robert Boyd for his Services as a Judge.	The whole act.
38 Geo. 3. c. 67	Export and Import Act 1798	An Act to continue an Act passed in the Thirty-seventh Year of His Majesty's Reign, entitled "An Act to regulate the Export, Import, and Sale of certain Articles therein mentioned."	The whole act.
38 Geo. 3. c. 68	N/A	An Act for appointing Commissioners to enquire into the Losses of such of His Majesty's loyal Subjects as have been Sufferers in their Property during the subsisting Rebellion in this Kingdom.	The whole act.
38 Geo. 3. c. 69	Annuity for the Prince of Mecklenburgh Strelitz Act 1798	An Act to enable His Majesty to grant an Annuity for the Life of His Serene Highness the Prince of Mecklenburgh Strelitz, Nephew to the Queen.	The whole act.
38 Geo. 3. c. 70	Annuity for Viscount Duncan Act 1798	An Act for settling and securing a certain Annuity on Adam Viscount Duncan, eminent service performed by the said Adam, Viscount Duncan, to His Majesty and the Public.	The whole act.
38 Geo. 3. c. 74	Indemnity (No. 2) Act (Ireland) 1798	An Act for indemnifying such Persons as have acted since the First Day of November One thousand seven hundred and ninety-seven for the preservation of the Public Peace and Suppression of Insurrections prevailing in some parts of this Kingdom.	The whole act.
38 Geo. 3. c. 76	Indemnity (No. 2) Act (Ireland) 1798	An Act for the Relief of Persons who have omitted to qualify themselves according to Law.	The whole act.
38 Geo. 3. c. 78	N/A	An Act to prevent Persons from returning to His Majesty's Dominions, passing into any Country at War with His Majesty.	The whole act.
38 Geo. 3. c. 79	N/A	An Act to authorize the issuing of Treasury Bills to the amount, Royal Canal to proceed in carrying on the said Canal.	Sections Four to Six.
38 Geo. 3. c. 80	N/A	An Act to compel certain Persons who have been engaged in the late Rebellion which hath broken out in this Kingdom to surrender themselves, and abide their Trials respectively, within a limited Time, on pain of being attainted of High Treason.	The whole act.
38 Geo. 3. c. 81	House of Commons Journals Act 1798	An Act for authorising the Payment of the Sums therein mentioned, granted for defraying the expence of reprinting the Journals of the House of Commons, and making Indexes thereto.	The whole act.
39 Geo. 3. c. 1 (I)	Militia Act (Ireland) 1799	An Act for defraying the charge of the Pay and Clothing of the Militia for One Year, from the Twenty-fifth Day of March One thousand seven hundred and ninety-nine.	The whole act.
39 Geo. 3. c. 2 (I)	Export Bounties Act 1799	An Act for regulating the Payment of Bounties on the Exportation of certain Manufactures of this Kingdom.	The whole act.
39 Geo. 3. c. 3 (I)	Indemnity Act (Ireland) 1799	An Act for indemnifying such Persons as have acted since the Sixth Day of October One thousand seven hundred and ninety-eight, for the Preservation of the Public Peace, and Suppression of Insurrections prevailing in several parts of this Kingdom.	The whole act.
39 Geo. 3. c. 4 (I)	Expiring Laws Continuance Act 1799	An Act for continuing an Act passed in the Thirty-third Year of His Majesty's Reign, and preventing the Disturbance of the Public Peace.	The whole act.
39 Geo. 3. c. 5 (I)	Stamp Act (Ireland) 1799	An Act for granting to His Majesty, His Heirs and Successors, several Duties therein mentioned, to be levied by the Commissioners for managing the Stamp Duties.	The whole act.
39 Geo. 3. c. 6 (I)	Mutiny Act (Ireland) 1799	An Act for punishing Mutiny and Desertion, and for the better Payment of the Army and their Quarters within this Kingdom.	The whole act.
39 Geo. 3. c. 7 (I)	National Debt Act (Ireland) 1799	An Act for securing the Payment of the Annuities, and of the Interest upon the Principal Sums, One thousand seven hundred and ninety-nine, and for other Purposes.	The whole act.
39 Geo. 3. c. 8 (I)	National Debt, Duties etc. Act 1799	An Act for granting for One Year the several Duties therein mentioned in lieu of all other Duties, Colonies, and for other Purposes therein mentioned.	The whole act.
39 Geo. 3. c. 10 (I)	Postage Act (Ireland) 1799	An Act for granting to His Majesty, His Heirs and Successors, certain Duties and Rates upon the Portage and Conveyance of all Letters and Packets within this Kingdom.	The whole act.
39 Geo. 3. c. 11 (I)	Courts Martial Act 1799	An Act for the Suppression of the Rebellion which still unhappily exists within this Kingdom, and for the Protection of the Persons and Properties of His Majesty's faithful Subjects within the same.	The whole act.
39 Geo. 3. c. 12 (I)	Hearth Duty Act 1799	An Act for granting to His Majesty, for One Year, the Duties therein mentioned on Fire-hearths, in lieu of all Duties payable on the same during the said term.	The whole act.
39 Geo. 3. c. 13 (I)	Trade with the United States Act 1799	An Act for further continuing an Act, entitled, An Act for facilitating Trade and Intercourse between this Kingdom and the United States of America.	The whole act.
39 Geo. 3. c. 14 (I)	Compensation for Tithes Act 1799	An Act to enable all Ecclesiastical Persons and Bodies, Rectors, Vicars, and Curates, against such persons as were liable to the same.	The whole act.
39 Geo. 3. c. 15 (I)	Window Tax Act 1799	An Act for granting to His Majesty certain Rates and Duties on Dwelling Houses inhabited, according to the number of Windows or Lights therein respectively.	The whole act.
39 Geo. 3. c. 18 (I)	Indemnity (No. 2) Act (Ireland) 1799	An Act for the Relief of Persons who have omitted to qualify themselves according to Law.	The whole act.
39 Geo. 3. c. 19 (I)	Cathedrals used as Parish Churches Act 1799	An Act for the Repairing of Cathedral Churches in cases where the Parish Churches have been long in Ruins.	Section One. Section Two, to "Unions respectively; and that."
39 Geo. 3. c. 20 (I)	N/A	An Act to continue an Act, made in the Thirty-eighth year of His Majesty's Reign, Duties on Fire-hearths, and on Coaches and other Carriages.	The whole act.
39 Geo. 3. c. 21 (I)	Coffee Act 1799	An Act to continue An Act passed in the Thirty-seventh Year of His Majesty's Reign, entitled, An Act for Regulating the Import, Export, and Sale of Coffee, and securing the Duties payable thereon.	The whole act.
39 Geo. 3. c. 22 (I)	Tobacco Act 1799	An Act to continue an Act passed in the Thirty-seventh Year of His Majesty's Reign, entitled "An Act for regulating and extending the Tobacco Trade, and for securing the Duties payable upon the Import and Manufacture of Tobacco."	The whole act.
39 Geo. 3. c. 23 (I)	Beer and Spirits Act 1799	An Act for granting additional Duties on Beer, Ale, and Spirits imported into this Kingdom.	The whole act.
39 Geo. 3. c. 24 (I)	Auctions, &c. Act 1799	An Act to amend and continue an Act passed last Session of Parliament, to serve for Hangings or other uses.	The whole act.
39 Geo. 3. c. 25 (I)	English Loan Act 1799	An Act to enable the Commissioners of the Treasury in Ireland to receive, such Persons as shall have paid such Voluntary Contribution as therein mentioned.	The whole act.
39 Geo. 3. c. 26 (I)	Sites for Barracks Act 1799	An Act to explain and amend the several Acts now in being, for the empowering the Commissioners of Barracks, for the better enabling them to proceed in their Marches.	The whole act.
39 Geo. 3. c. 27 (I)	Sugar Act 1799	An Act for the reduction of Drawbacks and Bounties now allowed on the Exportation of Sugar.	The whole act.
39 Geo. 3. c. 28 (I)	Corporations Act 1799	An Act to extend the Provisions of an Act passed in the last Session of Parliament, entitled "An Act for quieting Corporations."	The whole act.
39 Geo. 3. c. 29 (I)	Fisheries Act 1799	An Act to continue an Act passed in the Thirty-sixth year of His Majesty's Reign, entitled "An Act for continuing and amending the several Acts for the further Improvement and Extension of the Fisheries on the Coasts of this Kingdom."	The whole act.
39 Geo. 3. c. 30 (I)	Militia Act (Ireland) 1799	An Act to further explain and amend the Laws now in force relating to the Militia of this Kingdom.	The whole act.
39 Geo. 3. c. 31 (I)	Militia (No. 2) Act (Ireland) 1799	An Act for empowering His Majesty for a time, and to an extent to be limited, to accept the Services of such Parts of His Militia Forces in this Kingdom, as may voluntarily offer themselves, to be employed in Great Britain, or elsewhere in Europe.	The whole act.
39 Geo. 3. c. 32 (I)	N/A	An Act for granting unto His Majesty the several Duties therein mentioned on Sweets, or Made-wines, Mead, and Vinegar, and for securing the Collection thereof.	The whole act.
39 Geo. 3. c. 34 (I)	Malt Duties Act 1799	An Act to amend and continue an Act, passed in the Thirty-seventh Year of His Majesty's Reign, for collecting and securing His Majesty's Revenue upon Malt.	The whole act.
39 Geo. 3. c. 35 (I)	Excise Duties and Licences Act 1799	An Act for granting to His Majesty the Duties and Additional Duties on the Licenses therein mentioned.	The whole act.
39 Geo. 3. c. 36 (I)	N/A	An Act the title of which begins with the words,—An Act to explain, amend, and extend the provisions of an Act passed last session of Parliament,—and ends with the words,—to prohibit them from passing into any Country at War with His Majesty.	The whole act.
39 Geo. 3. c. 37 (I)	Gunpowder Act 1799	An Act the better to regulate the Manufacture and Sale of Gunpowder within this Kingdom.	The whole act.
39 Geo. 3. c. 38 (I)	Expiring Laws Continuance (No. 2) Act 1799	An Act the title of which begins with the words,—An Act to continue an Act passed in the Thirty-eighth Year of His Majesty's Reign,—and ends with the words,—for the better Management of the Workhouse and Founding Hospital in Dublin.	The whole act.
39 Geo. 3. c. 39 (I)	N/A	An Act for the better Collection of all Duties on Hides and Skins tanned and dressed in Oil, and on Vellum and Parchment made in Ireland, and for preventing of Frauds on His Majesty's Revenue therein.	The whole act.
39 Geo. 3. c. 42 (I)	Paper Duty Act 1799	An Act the title of which begins with the words,—An Act for granting to His Majesty the Duties therein mentioned on the several kinds of Paper,—and ends with the words,—Paper made in Ireland, and to prevent Frauds therein.	The whole act.
39 Geo. 3. c. 43 (I)	Duty on Goat Skins Act 1799	An Act for granting to His Majesty the Duties therein mentioned on Goat Skins exported.	The whole act.
39 Geo. 3. c. 44 (I)	Stamp (No. 2) Act (Ireland) 1799	An Act for the Relief of persons who have omitted, or may omit, inadvertently, to pay certain Stamp Duties therein mentioned, on Deeds or other Instruments.	The whole act.
39 Geo. 3. c. 45 (I)	Dublin Society Act 1799	An Act for directing the Application of the Sum of Five thousand five hundred pounds, granted by Parliament to the Dublin Society for the Improvement of Husbandry, and other useful Arts.	The whole act.
39 Geo. 3. c. 50 (I)	N/A	An Act the title of which begins with the words,—An Act to explain and amend an Act, entitled, An Act for indemnifying,—and ends, with the words,—Sheriffs and other Officers to make the Returns therein specified.	The whole act.
39 Geo. 3. c. 54 (I)	Sugar (No. 2) Act 1799	An Act for regulating the Allowance of the Drawback and Payment of the Bounty on the Exportation of Sugar.	The whole act.
39 Geo. 3. c. 56 (I)	Dublin Police, &c. Act 1799	An Act the title of which begins with the words,—An Act to amend an Act passed in the Thirty-fifth Year of the Reign of His present Majesty,—and ends with the words,—within the District of the Metropolis, or Three Miles thereof.	The whole act.
39 Geo. 3. c. 58 (I)	Rectifying of Spirits Act 1799	An Act to continue and amend an Act passed in the Thirty-eighth Year of His Majesty's Reign, entitled "An Act to regulate the Trade of rectifying Spirits, and to prevent Frauds on His Majesty's Revenue by Rectifiers of Spirits."	The whole act.
39 Geo. 3. c. 59 (I)	Forces (Tolls) Act 1799	An Act to enable His Majesty's Forces, under Orders of March, to pass through Turnpikes and over Bridges, Toll free. So far as it relates to Turnpikes.	The whole act.
39 Geo. 3. c. 60 (I)	Stock Exchange (Dublin) Act 1799	An Act for the better Regulation of Stockbrokers. Section Seven, so far as it relates to the Appropriation of Penalties, and from "in which no Essoign," to the end of the Section.	The whole act.
39 Geo. 3. c. 61 (I)	N/A	An Act the title of which begins with the words,—An Act to revive and continue the several Laws relating to the curing of Hides,—and ends with the words,—Bark imported into this Kingdom.	The whole act.
39 Geo. 3. c. 62 (I)	Game Licences Act 1799	An Act for granting to His Majesty certain Duties on Certificates to be issued with respect to the killing of Game.	The whole act.
39 Geo. 3. c. 64 (I)	Treasury Bills, &c. Act 1799	An Act the title of which begins with the words,—An Act for raising the several Sums therein mentioned, for the several Purposes,—and ends with the words,—defraying the Expence of defeating any Enterprise or Design of the common Enemy.	The whole act.
39 Geo. 3. c. 65 (I)	N/A	An Act the title of which begins with the words,—An Act for more effectually carrying into execution the Purposes of an Act passed last Session,—and ends with the words,—Persons who have rendered Service by Discovery of Traitors.	The whole act.
40 Geo. 3. c. 1 (I)	Militia Act (Ireland) 1800	An Act for enabling His Majesty to accept the Services of Volunteers from the Militia under certain restrictions, and for amending the Law relative to the Militia of Ireland.	The whole act.
40 Geo. 3. c. 2 (I)	Courts Martial Act 1800	An Act the title of which begins with the words,—An Act to revive with Amendments, an Act passed last Session,—and ends with the words,—Properties of His Majesty's faithful subjects within the same.	The whole act.
40 Geo. 3. c. 3 (I)	N/A	An Act the title of which begins with the words,—An Act for securing the payment of the Annuities, and of the Interest and Charges upon the principal Sums,—and ends with the words,—One thousand eight hundred, and for other purposes.	The whole act.
40 Geo. 3. c. 4 (I)	N/A	An Act the title of which begins with the words,—An Act for granting for one year the several Duties therein mentioned in lieu of all other Duties,—and ends with the words,—Colonies and for other purposes herein mentioned.	The whole act.
40 Geo. 3. c. 5 (I)	N/A	An Act for the Relief of Persons who have omitted to qualify themselves according to Law.	The whole act.
40 Geo. 3. c. 6 (I)	N/A	An Act to prohibit the making of Malt and distilling of Spirits in this Kingdom, for a limited time.	The whole act.
40 Geo. 3. c. 7 (I)	Mutiny Act (Ireland) 1800	An Act for punishing Mutiny and Desertion, and for the better Payment of the Army and their Quarters within this Kingdom.	The whole act.
40 Geo. 3. c. 8 (I)	Postage Act 1800	An Act for granting to His Majesty, His Heirs and Successors, certain Duties and Rates upon the Portage and Conveyance of all Letters and Packets within this Kingdom.	The whole act.
40 Geo. 3. c. 10 (I)	N/A	An Act for granting to His Majesty, His Heirs and Successors, several Duties therein mentioned, to be levied by the Commissioners for managing the Stamp Duties.	The whole act.
40 Geo. 3. c. 11 (I)	Sea Fisheries Act 1800	An Act to continue an Act passed in the Thirty-sixth Year of His Majesty's Reign, entitled "An Act for continuing and amending the several Acts for the further Improvement and Extension of the Fisheries on the Coasts of this Kingdom."	The whole act.
40 Geo. 3. c. 12 (I)	N/A	An Act for defraying the Charge of the Pay and Clothing of the Militia for one Year, from the Twenty-fifth day of March One thousand eight hundred.	The whole act.
40 Geo. 3. c. 13 (I)	American Trade Act 1800	An Act for further continuing an Act entitled, "An Act for facilitating the Trade and Intercourse between this Kingdom and the United States of America."	The whole act.
40 Geo. 3. c. 14 (I)	N/A	An Act the title of which begins with the words,—An Act for ascertaining the Stock of Foreign Wines belonging to Dealers,—and ends with the words,—America and the West Indies, in lieu of all other Duties.	The whole act.
40 Geo. 3. c. 15 (I)	N/A	An Act the title of which begins with the words,—An Act for continuing an Act, passed in the Thirty-third Year of His Majesty's Reign,—and ends with the words,—Arms and Ammunition, without Licence.	The whole act.
40 Geo. 3. c. 16 (I)	N/A	An Act for granting to His Majesty, His Heirs and Successors, several Duties therein mentioned, to be levied by the Commissioners for managing the Stamp Duties.	The whole act.
40 Geo. 3. c. 17 (I)	Silk Manufacture Act 1800	An Act to continue an Act passed in the Thirty-sixth Year of His present Majesty's Reign.	The whole act.
40 Geo. 3. c. 18 (I)	N/A	An Act to empower the Lord Lieutenant, or other Chief Governor or Governors of Ireland, to apprehend and detain such Persons as he or they shall suspect of conspiring against His Majesty's Person and Government.	The whole act.
40 Geo. 3. c. 19 (I)	N/A	An Act to enact that part of an Act passed in the Parliament of England in the Eighth Year of Richard the Second shall not continue to be of force in this Kingdom, any Law to the contrary notwithstanding.	The whole act.
40 Geo. 3. c. 20 (I)	Export Bounties Act 1800	An Act for regulating the Payment of Bounties on the exportation of certain Manufactures of this Kingdom.	Sections Fifteen and Sixteen.
40 Geo. 3. c. 22 (I)	Bankers' Act 1800	An Act for the relief of Bankers who have stopped, or who shall stop, Payment, and who have or shall conform to the directions of the Act of Parliament of the Thirty-third of George the Second, called the Banker's Act.	Section Three.
40 Geo. 3. c. 23 (I)	N/A	An Act to quiet and bar all claims of Tythe Agistment for dry and barren Cattle.	The whole act.
40 Geo. 3. c. 25 (I)	N/A	An Act for granting an Additional Duty on Refined Sugars imported into this Kingdom.	The whole act.
40 Geo. 3. c. 27 (I)	N/A	An Act for the further Support and Maintenance of Curates within the Church of Ireland.	Section Four.
40 Geo. 3. c. 28 (I)	N/A	An Act for amending an Act passed this Session of Parliament, entitled "An Act to prohibit the Making of Malt and Distilling of Spirits in this Kingdom."	The whole act.
40 Geo. 3. c. 29 (I)	N/A	An Act to regulate the Mode by which the Lords Spiritual and Temporal, and the Commons, to serve in the United Kingdom on the part of Ireland shall be summoned and returned to the said Parliament.	Section One to "from time to time, as is hereinafter provided." Section Four to "as the case may require; and". Sections Five and Six.
40 Geo. 3. c. 31 (I)	Dublin Society Act 1800	An Act for directing the Application of the Sum of Five thousand five hundred Pounds.	The whole act.
40 Geo. 3. c. 33 (I)	Rotunda Hospital Act 1800	An Act for the better Management, Support, and Maintenance of the Foundling Hospital.	Sections One and Four. Sections Eight to Fifteen. Sections Seventeen and Eighteen.
40 Geo. 3. c. 34 (I)	N/A	An Act for granting Allowances to Bodies Corporate and Individuals.	The whole act.
40 Geo. 3. c. 38 (I)	Act of Union (Ireland) 1800	An Act for the Union of Great Britain and Ireland.	Section One so far as it relates to the Parts of Articles following, namely:- Article Fourth,-The Tenth Paragraph. Article Sixth,-The Third Paragraph, from "and that for the period" to the end of that Paragraph,-the Fourth and last Paragraphs, and Article Seventh, and so much of the rest of that Article as relates to such Schedules.
40 Geo. 3. c. 39 (I)	Court of Exchequer Chamber Act 1800	An Act for the more speedy Correction of erroneous Judgments given in the Courts of Law in this Kingdom.	The whole act.
40 Geo. 3. c. 42 (I)	N/A	An Act for the Relief of Confined Debtors who may be Insolvent.	The whole act.
40 Geo. 3. c. 43 (I)	Revenue Act 1800	An Act the title of which begins with the words,—An Act for better regulating the Collection of His Majesty's Revenue,—and ends with the words,—Statutes which are mentioned to be continued by this Act.	The whole act.
40 Geo. 3. c. 44 (I)	N/A	An Act to prevent Persons from returning to His Majesty's Dominions who have been or shall be Transported, Banished, or Exiled on Account of Rebellion.	The whole act.
40 Geo. 3. c. 45 (I)	N/A	An Act the title of which begins with the words,—An Act for granting to His Majesty Excise Duties on Foreign Wines,—and ends with the words,—Sweets or made Wines made in Ireland.	The whole act.
40 Geo. 3. c. 46 (I)	N/A	An Act the title of which begins with the words,—An Act for amending an Act, entitled "An Act for confirming the several Grants,"—and ends with the words,—Trustees and Commissioners of the said First Fruits.	The whole act.
40 Geo. 3. c. 49 (I)	N/A	An Act the title of which begins with the words,—An Act to amend and continue two several Acts passed in the Thirty-eighth and Thirty-ninth Years,—and ends with the words,—Danger, or sustained Injury in consequence thereof.	The whole act.
40 Geo. 3. c. 50 (I)	N/A	An Act for granting certain Annuities to the Officers and Attendants of both Houses of Parliament, whose Offices and Attendance shall cease after the Union, or whose Offices shall be diminished in Value thereby.	The whole act.
40 Geo. 3. c. 51 (I)	Inland Navigation Act 1800	Sections One to Nine. Section Twenty-one. Sections Twenty-three to Twenty-five. Sections Twenty-seven and Twenty-eight. Sections Thirty-one to Thirty-five.	
40 Geo. 3. c. 52 (I)	N/A	An Act the title of which begins with the words,—An Act to regulate the Collection of the Rates,—and ends with the words,—to secure the due Payment thereof.	The whole act.
40 Geo. 3. c. 53 (I)	N/A	An Act to enable His Majesty to grant certain Annuities to the Right Honourable John Monck Mason, and to the Earls of Athlone and Roscommon, and to the Lord Baron Aylmer, in manner therein mentioned.	The whole act.
40 Geo. 3. c. 54 (I)	N/A	An Act for continuing and amending the several Laws for regulating the Issuing of Licences for the Sale of Wine, Ale, Beer, Cider, and Spirituous Liquors by retail, and for preventing the immoderate use of Spirituous Liquors.	The whole act.
40 Geo. 3. c. 55 (I)	N/A	An Act to encourage the Distillation of Spirits from Sugar for a limited Time.	The whole act.
40 Geo. 3. c. 56 (I)	Rectifying of Spirits Act 1800	An Act the title of which begins with the words,—An Act to continue an Act passed in the Thirty-eighth Year of His Majesty's Reign,—and ends with the words,—His Majesty's Revenue by Rectifiers of Spirits.	The whole act.
40 Geo. 3. c. 57 (I)	N/A	An Act to amend and continue an Act passed in the Thirty-seventh Year of His Majesty's Reign for collecting and securing His Majesty's Revenue upon Malt.	The whole act.
40 Geo. 3. c. 58 (I)	N/A	An Act to amend two Acts passed in this Session of Parliament, One intitled "An Act to prohibit the making of Malt and distilling of Spirits in this Kingdom for a limited Time," and the other for amending the said Act.	The whole act.
40 Geo. 3. c. 59 (I)	Game Licences Act 1800	An Act the title of which begins with the words,—An Act to amend and explain an Act passed in the Fortieth Year of the Reign of His present Majesty,—and ends with the words,—to be levied by the Commissioners for managing the Stamp Duties.	The whole act.
40 Geo. 3. c. 60 (I)	Treasury Bills, &c. Act 1800	An Act for granting to His Majesty a further Supply out of the Consolidated Fund, to be applied to the Purposes therein mentioned, and for raising by Loan the several Sums therein mentioned.	The whole act.
40 Geo. 3. c. 62 (I)	N/A	An Act for amending and making perpetual the several Laws for regulating the Watch in the District of the Metropolis, and for granting a further Duty upon Pawnbrokers.	Section One. Sections Nineteen to Twenty-two.
40 Geo. 3. c. 63 (I)	Dealers' Licences Act 1800	An Act the title of which begins with the words,—An Act for the better regulation of and securing the Duties payable on Licenses,—and ends with the words,—Expences of distraining for the King's Rents, and for other Purposes.	The whole act.
40 Geo. 3. c. 67 (I)	Distillers Act 1800	An Act for regulating the Trade of a Distiller, and for securing the Duties payable on home-made Spirits.	The whole act.
40 Geo. 3. c. 69 (I)	N/A	An Act the title of which begins with the words,—An Act to enable His Majesty to grant Annuities to the Lord High Chancellor,—and ends with the words,—the Chief Baron and other Barons of the Court of Exchequer in this Kingdom.	Sections Two to Six. Sections Ten, Eleven, and Thirteen.
40 Geo. 3. c. 70 (I)	N/A	An Act for discharging certain Arrears of Quit, Crown, and Composition Rents, which have been growing due for Twenty Years before the Twenty-ninth Day of September One thousand seven hundred and ninety-nine, on the Terms and in manner therein mentioned.	The whole act.
40 Geo. 3. c. 78 (I)	Tanning Act 1800	An Act the title of which begins with the words,—An Act for amending an Act passed in the last Session of Parliament,—and ends with the words,—weighing and delivery of Bark imported into this Kingdom.	The whole act.
40 Geo. 3. c. 79 (I)	Quarantine Act 1800	An Act to oblige Ships more effectually to perform their Quarantine, and to prevent the Plague and other infectious Distempers being brought into Ireland, and to hinder the spreading of Infection.	The whole act.
40 Geo. 3. c. 80 (I)	Parliamentary Elections Act 1800	An Act the title of which begins with the words,—An Act to explain and amend an Act passed in the Thirty-fifth Year of His present Majesty's Reign,—and ends with the words,—further regulation of the election of Members to serve in Parliament.	Section Six.
40 Geo. 3. c. 81 (I)	N/A	An Act the title of which begins with the words,—An Act to enable all ecclesiastical Persons and Bodies, Rectors, Vicars, and Curates,—and ends with the words,—against such Persons as were liable to the same.	The whole act.
40 Geo. 3. c. 83 (I)	N/A	An Act to facilitate the building and re-building of Churches and Chapels.	The whole act.
40 Geo. 3. c. 84 (I)	Royal College of Physicians, Ireland, Act 1800	An Act the title of which begins with the words,—An Act for repealing an Act passed in the Twenty-fifth Year of His present Majesty,—and ends with the words,—a complete School of Physic in this Kingdom.	Section One. Sections Five to Eight. Section Twelve from "and until such Hospital" to the end of the Section. Section Thirty-six. Section Forty-one from "that such of the Fellows" to "Fellowships respectively." Section Forty-three. Section Forty-four from "provided that" to the end of the Section.
40 Geo. 3. c. 86 (I)	Coffee Act 1800	An Act to continue an Act passed in the Thirty-seventh Year of His Majesty's Reign, entitled, An Act for regulating the Import, Export, and Sale of Coffee, and securing the Duties payable thereon.	The whole act.
40 Geo. 3. c. 87 (I)	Auctions Act 1800	An Act the title of which begins with the words,—An Act to continue and amend two several Acts passed in the Thirty-eighth and Thirty-ninth Years,—and ends with the words,—Paper Printed, Painted, or Stained, to serve for Hangings and other Uses.	The whole act.
40 Geo. 3. c. 88 (I)	Highways Act 1800	An Act to amend an Act for repair of the Public Roads, and to revive and explain an Act for holding Vestries in the Province of Ulster, and for empowering the Lord Lieutenant, or other Chief Governor, to reduce the expence of the Police Establishment.	The whole act.
40 Geo. 3. c. 89 (I)	N/A	An Act the title of which begins with the words,—An Act for indemnifying such Persons as have acted since the First Day of June,—and ends with the words,—Sheriffs and other Officers to make the Returns therein specified.	The whole act.
40 Geo. 3. c. 91 (I)	Militia (No. 2) Act (Ireland) 1800	An Act the title of which begins with the words,—An Act to empower the Colonels or Commanding Officers of the Militia,—and ends with the words,—willing to re-enlist before their Time of Service shall expire.	The whole act.
40 Geo. 3. c. 96 (I)	Cork and Dublin Coalyards Act 1800	An Act to revive, amend, continue, or make perpetual certain Temporary Statutes.	The whole act.

== See also ==
- Statute Law Revision Act
