= List of acts of the Parliament of Ireland, 1771–1780 =

This is a list of acts of the Parliament of Ireland for the years from 1771 to 1780.

The number shown by each act's title is its chapter number. Acts are cited using this number, preceded by the years of the reign during which the relevant parliamentary session was held; thus the act concerning assay passed in 1783 is cited as "23 & 24 Geo. 3. c. 23", meaning the 23rd act passed during the session that started in the 23rd year of the reign of George III and which finished in the 24th year of that reign. The modern convention is to use Arabic numerals in citations (thus "40 Geo. 3" rather than "40 Geo. III"). Acts of the reign of Elizabeth I are formally cited without a regnal numeral in the Republic of Ireland.

Acts passed by the Parliament of Ireland did not have a short title; however, some of these acts have subsequently been given a short title by acts of the Parliament of the United Kingdom, acts of the Parliament of Northern Ireland, or acts of the Oireachtas. This means that some acts have different short titles in the Republic of Ireland and Northern Ireland respectively. Official short titles are indicated by the flags of the respective jurisdictions.

A number of the acts included in this list are still in force in Northern Ireland or the Republic of Ireland. Because these two jurisdictions are entirely separate, the version of an act in force in one may differ from the version in force in the other; similarly, an act may have been repealed in one but not in the other.

A number of acts passed by the Parliament of Great Britain also extended to Ireland during this period.

== 11 & 12 Geo. 3 (1771) ==
The 3rd session of the 2nd parliament of George III, which met from 8 October 1771 to 2 June 1772.

This session was also traditionally cited as 11 & 12 G. 3.

=== Public acts ===
Short title, or popular name	Citation	Royal assent
Long title
Import Duties and Prohibitions Act 1771 (repealed)	11 & 12 Geo. 3. c. 1 (I)	1 January 1772
An Act for granting unto his Majesty an additional duty on the several commodities goods and merchandizes therein mentioned and for prohibiting the importation of all gold and silver lace and of all cambricks and lawns except of the manufacture of Great Britain. (Repealed by Statute Law Revision (Ireland) Act 1879 (42 & 43 Vict. c. 24))
Government Loans and Duties Act 1771 (repealed)	11 & 12 Geo. 3. c. 2 (I)	24 December 1771
An Act for granting to his Majesty the several duties, rates, impositions and taxes therein particularly expressed, to be applied to the payment of the interest of the sums therein provided for, and towards the discharge of the said principal sums in such manner as therein directed. (Repealed by Statute Law Revision (Ireland) Act 1879 (42 & 43 Vict. c. 24))
Hawkers, Pedlars, and Schools Act 1771 (repealed)	11 & 12 Geo. 3. c. 3 (I)	24 March 1772
An Act for licensing hawkers and pedlars, and for encouragement of English protestant schools. (Repealed by Statute Law Revision (Ireland) Act 1879 (42 & 43 Vict. c. 24))
Inland Navigation Duties Act 1771 (repealed)	11 & 12 Geo. 3. c. 4 (I)	24 March 1772
An Act for granting and continuing to his Majesty the several duties, rates, and impositions therein mentioned for the use of the corporation for promoting and carrying on an inland navigation in Ireland. (Repealed by Statute Law Revision (Ireland) Act 1879 (42 & 43 Vict. c. 24))
Northern Counties Disturbances Act 1771	11 & 12 Geo. 3. c. 5 (I)	15 May 1772
An Act for the more effectual punishing wicked and disorderly persons who have committed, or shall commit, violences, and do injuries to the persons or properties of any of his Majesty's subjects in the counties of Antrim, Down, Armagh, city and county of Londonderry, and county of Tyrone, or any of them; or who shall deliver or publish threatening letters, or who resist or oppose the levying the publick taxes in the said counties, or any of them; and for the more effectual bringing to justice certain offenders therein mentioned.
Customs Act 1771 (repealed)	11 & 12 Geo. 3. c. 6 (I)	15 May 1772
An Act for amending and explaining a proviso or clause contained in an act passed in the 14th and 15th years of the reign of King Charles II entitled "An Act for settling the subsidy of poundage, and granting a subsidy of tonnage, and other sums of money unto his royal majesty, his heirs and successors, the same to be paid upon merchandises imported and exported into or out of the kingdom of Ireland, according to a book of rates hereunto annexed." (Note: Customs Act 1662 (14 & 15 Chas. 2 Sess. 4. c. 9 (I))) (Repealed by Statute Law Revision (Ireland) Act 1879 (42 & 43 Vict. c. 24))
Revenue and Frauds (Ireland) Act 1771 (repealed)	11 & 12 Geo. 3. c. 7 (I)	15 May 1772
An Act for the further Improvement of His Majesty's Revenue, and the more effectual preventing of Frauds therein; and for continuing and amending several Laws heretofore made and now in force relative to His Majesty's said Revenue. (Repealed by Statute Law Revision (Ireland) Act 1879 (42 & 43 Vict. c. 24))
Frauds by Bankrupts Act 1771	11 & 12 Geo. 3. c. 8 (I)	15 May 1772
An Act to prevent Frauds committed by Bankrupts.
Dublin Corn and Flour Bounties Act 1771 (repealed)	11 & 12 Geo. 3. c. 9 (I)	15 May 1772
An Act for the better preventing of Frauds committed by persons claiming the Bounties for supplying the City of Dublin with Corn and Flour. (Repealed by Statute Law Revision (Ireland) Act 1879 (42 & 43 Vict. c. 24))
Mortgage Securities (Ireland) Act 1771	11 & 12 Geo. 3. c. 10 (I)	15 May 1772
An Act for rendering securities by mortgage more effectual.
Dublin Foundling Hospital Act 1771	11 & 12 Geo. 3. c. 11 (I)	2 June 1772
An Act for better regulating the Foundling Hospital and Workhouse in the city of Dublin, and increasing the fund for the support thereof; also for making a provision for appointing a Locum Tenens in case of the death or absence of the Lord Mayor, or the President of the Court of Conscience. (Repealed for the Republic of Ireland by Statute Law Revision (Pre-Union Irish Statutes) Act 1962 (No. 29))
Privilege of Parliament Act 1771 (repealed)	11 & 12 Geo. 3. c. 12 (I)	2 June 1772
An Act for the further preventing delays of justice by reason of privilege of parliament. (Repealed by Statute Law Revision (Ireland) Act 1879 (42 & 43 Vict. c. 24))
City of Dublin Act 1771	11 & 12 Geo. 3. c. 13 (I)	2 June 1772
An Act for the better paving, cleansing, lighting, altering, and improving the new street, called Sackville-street and the Mall, (Note: O'Connell Street, Dublin.) in the city of Dublin, and the lanes and avenues leading into the same; as also the street called Marlborough-street, (Note: Marlborough Street, Dublin.) running parallel thereto on the east side, with the lanes and avenues leading into the same.
Fires and Watches (Ireland) Act 1771 (repealed)	11 & 12 Geo. 3. c. 14 (I)	2 June 1772
An Act for preventing the spreading of fires, and for appointing of watches in cities and towns corporate. (Repealed by Statute Law Revision (Ireland) Act 1879 (42 & 43 Vict. c. 24))
Deserted Infants (Ireland) Act 1771 (repealed)	11 & 12 Geo. 3. c. 15 (I)	2 June 1772
An Act for the relief of poor infants who are or shall be deserted by their parents. (Repealed by Statute Law Revision (Ireland) Act 1879 (42 & 43 Vict. c. 24))
Parochial Chapels (Ireland) Act 1771 (repealed)	11 & 12 Geo. 3. c. 16 (I)	2 June 1772
An Act for erecting parochial chapels of ease in parishes of large extent, and making such chapels and those that are already erected perpetual cures, and for making a proper provision for the maintenance of perpetual curates to officiate in the same, and also in like manner for making appropriate parishes perpetual cures. (Repealed by Statute Law Revision (Ireland) Act 1879 (42 & 43 Vict. c. 24))
Clergy Residence and Glebe Lands (Ireland) Act 1771	11 & 12 Geo. 3. c. 17 (I)	2 June 1772
An Act for rendering more effectual the several laws for the better enabling the clergy having cure of souls to reside upon their benefices and to build on their respective glebe lands and to prevent dilapidations, and for the encouragement of Protestant schools within this kingdom.
City of Cork Act 1771	11 & 12 Geo. 3. c. 18 (I)	15 May 1772
An Act for the regulation of the city of Cork, and for other purposes therein mentioned relative to the said city.
Expiring Statutes Continuance (Ireland) Act 1771 (repealed)	11 & 12 Geo. 3. c. 19 (I)	2 June 1772
An Act for reviving and continuing several temporary Statutes that have lately expired, and for continuing others that are near expiring. (Repealed by Statute Law Revision (Ireland) Act 1879 (42 & 43 Vict. c. 24))
Narrow Roads (Ireland) Act 1771	11 & 12 Geo. 3. c. 20 (I)	2 June 1772
An Act for making of narrow roads through the mountainous unimproved parts of this kingdom.
Unprofitable Bogs (Ireland) Act 1771	11 & 12 Geo. 3. c. 21 (I)	2 June 1772
An Act to encourage the reclaiming of unprofitable bogs. (Repealed for the Republic of Ireland by Statute Law Revision (Pre-Union Irish Statutes) Act 1962 (No. 29))
Burial in Churches (Ireland) Act 1771 (repealed)	11 & 12 Geo. 3. c. 22 (I)	2 June 1772
An Act to prevent burying Dead Bodies in Churches. (Repealed by Statute Law Revision (Ireland) Act 1879 (42 & 43 Vict. c. 24))
Cork Infirmary Act 1771	11 & 12 Geo. 3. c. 23 (I)	2 June 1772
An Act for establishing an infirmary in the south suburbs of the city of Cork, and to vest an house and front lot of ground in the south suburbs of said city (or any other house or grounds that may be taken) in certain trustees for ever, and to give such trustees such power as may be necessary to promote and execute the purposes of an infirmary in the south suburbs of the city of Cork.
Limerick Navigation Act 1771	11 & 12 Geo. 3. c. 24 (I)	2 June 1772
An Act to enable the corporation for promoting and carrying on an inland navigation in this kingdom to erect and make a lock adjoining to the long dock of the old quay in the city of Limerick.
Partnerships Act 1771	11 & 12 Geo. 3. c. 25 (I)	2 June 1772
An Act for amending an act (Note: Partnerships Regulation Act 1741 (15 Geo. 2. c. 7 (I))) for the better regulation of partnerships to encourage the trade and manufacture of this Kingdom. (Repealed for the Republic of Ireland by Statute Law Revision (Pre-Union Irish Statutes) Act 1962 (No. 29))
Lagan Navigation Act 1771	11 & 12 Geo. 3. c. 26 (I)	2 June 1772
An Act for continuing two several acts, one passed in the 27th year of his late majesty King George II, (Note: Lagan Navigation Act 1753 (27 Geo. 2. c. 3 (I))) and the other in the 3rd year of his present majesty's reign, (Note: Lagan Navigation Act 1763 (3 Geo. 3. c. 6 (I))) for making the River Lagan navigable, and opening a communication by water between Lough Neagh and the town of Belfast, and for enabling the commissioners therein named to raise money by assignment of said duties, for the more effectual carrying on said work.
Converted Popish Priests (Ireland) Act 1771 (repealed)	11 & 12 Geo. 3. c. 27 (I)	2 June 1772
An Act for explaining and amending an act made in the 8th year of the reign of her late majesty Queen Anne (Note: Popery Act 1709 (8 Anne c. 3 (I))) entitled "An Act for explaining and amending an act (Note: Popery Act 1703 (2 Anne c. 6 (I))) entitled 'An Act to prevent the further growth of Popery'" so far only as the same makes a provision for the maintenance of Popish priests converted to the Protestant religion within the time thereby prescribed. (Repealed by Statute Law Revision (Ireland) Act 1879 (42 & 43 Vict. c. 24))
Lime Kilns (Dublin) Act 1771^{(Republic of Ireland)}	11 & 12 Geo. 3. c. 28 (I)	2 June 1772
An Act for preventing the erecting of lime kilns in the city of Dublin, or the suburbs thereof.
Popery Act Qualification Time Act 1771 (repealed)	11 & 12 Geo. 3. c. 29 (I)	2 June 1772
An Act for allowing further time to persons in offices or employments to qualify themselves pursuant to an act, intitled, "An Act to prevent the further growth of popery." (Repealed by Statute Law Revision (Ireland) Act 1879 (42 & 43 Vict. c. 24))
Badging and Begging (Ireland) Act 1771 (repealed)	11 & 12 Geo. 3. c. 30 (I)	2 June 1772
An Act for badging such poor as shall be found unable to support themselves by labour, and otherwise providing for them, and for restraining such as shall be found able to support themselves by labour or industry from begging. (Repealed by Statute Law Revision (Ireland) Act 1879 (42 & 43 Vict. c. 24))
Grand Canal Act 1771	11 & 12 Geo. 3. c. 31 (I)	2 June 1772
An Act for enabling certain persons to carry on and compleat the grand canal.
Insolvent Debtors (Ireland) Act 1771 (repealed)	11 & 12 Geo. 3. c. 32 (I)	2 June 1772
An Act for the relief of several insolvent debtors named in the annexed schedules. (Repealed by Statute Law Revision (Ireland) Act 1879 (42 & 43 Vict. c. 24))
Dublin Journeymen Tailors and Shipwrights Act 1771 (repealed)	11 & 12 Geo. 3. c. 33 (I)	2 June 1772
An Act for regulating the journeymen taylors and journeymen shipwrights of the city of Dublin and the liberties thereof, and of the county of Dublin. (Repealed by Statute Law Revision (Ireland) Act 1879 (42 & 43 Vict. c. 24))
Criminal Justice Act 1771 or the Criminal Justice (Venue) Act (Ireland) 1771 (repealed)	11 & 12 Geo. 3. c. 34 (I)	2 June 1772
An Act for the remitting of prisoners with their indictments by the justices of his Majesty's court of King's Bench to the places, where the crimes were committed. (Repealed for the Republic of Ireland by Statute Law Revision (Pre-Union Irish Statutes) Act 1962 (No. 29) and for Northern Ireland by Judicature (Northern Ireland) Act 1978 (c. 23))
Vesey's Estate Road (Ireland) Act 1771	11 & 12 Geo. 3. c. 35 (I)	2 June 1772
An Act to empower Agmondisham Vesey esquire, to enclose that part of the old road which lies on the west side of the little river, called the Griffin, upon laying out such other road, as in this act is mentioned.

=== Private acts ===
Short title, or popular name	Citation	Royal assent
Long title
Marlay's Estate Act 1771	11 & 12 Geo. 3. c. 1 Pr. (I)	15 May 1772
An Act for making and confirming a partition of an undivided estate of Thomas Marlay, esquire, and Hugh Crofton, a minor under the age of 21 years, and for giving power to make leases and settle a jointure, and for other purposes.
Lord Eyre's Estate Act 1771	11 & 12 Geo. 3. c. 2 Pr. (I)	2 June 1772
An Act for vesting part of the settled estate of the Right Honourable John, Lord Eyre, baron of Eyre Court, in trustees, and their heirs, to be sold in lieu and stead of part of the said settled estate, and for other purposes.
Lord St George's Estate Act 1771	11 & 12 Geo. 3. c. 3 Pr. (I)	2 June 1772
An Act for ratifying and confirming certain leases for lives renewable forever, of certain grounds in and adjoining to Dominick Street in the city of Dublin, made by the Right Honourable Usher, Lord St George, baron of Hatley St George, and Elizabeth, Lady St George, his wife, against them, and against the issue of their bodies, and all other person and persons claiming or to claim under the settlement made upon their intermarriage.
Freke's Estate Act 1771	11 & 12 Geo. 3. c. 4 Pr. (I)	2 June 1772
An Act to enable Sir John Freke, baronet, to raise, by sale, mortgage or demise of a competent part of the towns and lands therein mentioned, such sum or sums of money as will be sufficient to discharge the encumbrances and debts affecting the same, and for other purposes.
Stearne's Estate Act 1771	11 & 12 Geo. 3. c. 5 Pr. (I)	2 June 1772
An Act to vest the estate of the Right Reverend Father in God, John Stearne, late lord bishop of Clogher, deceased, in trustees, in trust for carrying the charitable and other bequests of his will into execution.
Tenison's Estate Act 1771	11 & 12 Geo. 3. c. 6 Pr. (I)	2 June 1772
An Act for vesting in trustees the settled estate of Thomas Tenison of Rosefield in the county of Monaghan, esquire, in order that a competent part thereof may be sold for payment of debts and encumbrances.
Stepney's Estate Act 1771	11 & 12 Geo. 3. c. 7 Pr. (I)	2 June 1772
An Act for vesting lands, tenements and hereditaments situate in the counties of Limerick, Cork, Westmeath and in the King's County, the estate of George Stepney, esquire, in trustees, in order that the same, or a competent part thereof, may be sold for the payment of debts and encumbrances affecting the same.

=== Sources ===
- "Acts of Parliament by Session: 1771B". Irish Legislation Database. Queen's University Belfast.
- "Pre-Union Irish Statutes: 1771 Acts". Irish Statute Book. Attorney General of Ireland.

== 13 & 14 Geo. 3 (1773) ==
The 4th session of the 2nd parliament of George III, which met from 12 October 1773 to 2 June 1774.

This session was also traditionally cited as 13 & 14 G. 3.

=== Public acts ===
Short title, or popular name	Citation	Royal assent
Long title
Additional Duties Act 1773 (repealed)	13 & 14 Geo. 3. c. 1 (I)	25 December 1773
An act for granting unto his Majesty an additional duty on beer, ale, strong waters, wine, tobacco, hides, and other goods and merchandizes therein mentioned; and for prohibiting the importation of all gold and silver lace, and of all cambricks and lawns, except of the manufacture of Great Britain. (Repealed by Statute Law Revision (Ireland) Act 1879 (42 & 43 Vict. c. 24))
Loan Duties Act 1773 (repealed)	13 & 14 Geo. 3. c. 2 (I)	25 December 1773
An Act for granting unto his majesty the several duties, rates, impositions and taxes therein particularly expressed to be applied to pay an interest at the rate of 4 per cent per annum for such part of the principal sums formerly borrowed as shall remain unpaid on the 25th day of December 1773, and to apply the surplus of the said duties in such manner and for such purposes as shall be directed by parliament. (Repealed by Statute Law Revision (Ireland) Act 1879 (42 & 43 Vict. c. 24))
Additional Duties (No. 2) Act 1773 (repealed)	13 & 14 Geo. 3. c. 3 (I)	25 December 1773
An Act for granting to his Majesty an additional duty upon the several goods and merchandizes therein mentioned. (Repealed by Statute Law Revision (Ireland) Act 1879 (42 & 43 Vict. c. 24))
Disorderly Persons Act 1773 (repealed)	13 & 14 Geo. 3. c. 4 (I)	25 December 1773
An Act to repeal an Act, intitled, "An Act for the more effectual punishing wicked and disorderly Persons, who have committed or shall commit violences, and do Injuries to the Persons or Properties of any of His Majesty's Subjects in the Counties of Antrim, Down, Armagh, City and County of Londonderry, and County of Tyrone, or any of them, or who shall deliver or publish threatening Letters, or who resist or oppose the Levying the Publick Taxes in the said Counties, or any of them, and for the more effectual bringing to Justice certain Offenders therein mentioned." (Note: Northern Counties Disturbances Act 1771 (11 & 12 Geo. 3. c. 5 (I))) (Repealed by Statute Law Revision (Ireland) Act 1879 (42 & 43 Vict. c. 24))
Annuities Act 1773 (repealed)	13 & 14 Geo. 3. c. 5 (I)	28 January 1774
An Act for granting Annuities in the Manner therein provided to such Persons, as shall voluntarily Subscribe towards the Raising a Sum not exceeding the Sum of Two Hundred and Sixty Five Thousand Pounds. (Repealed by Statute Law Revision (Ireland) Act 1879 (42 & 43 Vict. c. 24))
Stamp Duties Act 1773 (repealed)	13 & 14 Geo. 3. c. 6 (I)	28 January 1774
An Act for granting to his Majesty, his heirs and successors, several duties upon vellum, parchment, and paper. (Repealed by Statute Law Revision (Ireland) Act 1879 (42 & 43 Vict. c. 24))
Annuities (No. 2) Act 1773 (repealed)	13 & 14 Geo. 3. c. 7 (I)	7 March 1774
An Act to explain and amend an Act passed in this Session of Parliament, entitled, "An Act for granting Annuities in the Manner therein provided to such Persons as shall voluntarily subscribe towards the raising a sum not exceeding the Sum of Two Hundred and Sixty Five Thousand Pounds." (Note: Annuities Act 1773 (13 & 14 Geo. 3. c. 5 (I))) (Repealed by Statute Law Revision (Ireland) Act 1879 (42 & 43 Vict. c. 24))
Revenue Laws Act 1773 (repealed)	13 & 14 Geo. 3. c. 8 (I)	4 May 1774
An Act for continuing and amending several laws now in force relating to his Majesty's revenue, and for the more effectually preventing frauds therein. (Repealed by Statute Law Revision (Ireland) Act 1879 (42 & 43 Vict. c. 24))
Hawkers and Pedlars Act 1773 (repealed)	13 & 14 Geo. 3. c. 9 (I)	4 May 1774
An Act for licensing hawkers and pedlars, and for the encouragement of English protestant schools. (Repealed by Statute Law Revision (Ireland) Act 1879 (42 & 43 Vict. c. 24))
Churches Repair Act 1773	13 & 14 Geo. 3. c. 10 (I)	4 May 1774
An Act to explain and amend an act made in the 3rd year of the reign of his late majesty King George II entitled "An Act for better keeping churches in repair." (Note: Churches Repair Act 1729 (3 Geo. 2. c. 11 (I)))
Tillage Act 1773 (repealed)	13 & 14 Geo. 3. c. 11 (I)	4 May 1774
An Act for amending an Act passed in the Twenty-ninth Year of the Reign of His late Majesty King George the Second entitled "An Act for the further encouragement of Tillage." (Note: Tillage Act 1755 (29 Geo. 2. c. 9 (I))) (Repealed by Statute Law Revision (Ireland) Act 1879 (42 & 43 Vict. c. 24))
Lagan Navigation Act 1773	13 & 14 Geo. 3. c. 12 (I)	4 May 1774
An Act for continuing and amending three several acts, one passed in the reign of his late majesty King George II, (Note: Lagan Navigation Act 1753 (27 Geo. 2. c. 3 (I))) and the other two in his present majesty's reign, (Note: Lagan Navigation Act 1763 (3 Geo. 3. c. 6 (I))) (Note: Lagan Navigation Act 1771 (11 & 12 Geo. 3. c. 26 (I))) for making the River Lagan navigable, and opening a communication by water between Lough Neagh and the town of Belfast, and for enabling the commissioners therein named to raise money by assignment of said duties, for the more expeditious and effectual carrying on of said work.
Popery Act 1773 (repealed)	13 & 14 Geo. 3. c. 13 (I)	4 May 1774
An Act for allowing further time to persons in offices or employments, to qualify themselves pursuant to an act, entitled, "An Act to prevent the further growth of popery." (Note: Popery Act 1703 (2 Anne c. 6 (I))) (Repealed by Statute Law Revision (Ireland) Act 1879 (42 & 43 Vict. c. 24))
Forgery Act 1773 (repealed)	13 & 14 Geo. 3. c. 14 (I)	4 May 1774
An Act for the more effectual preventing the forging or altering the acceptance or endorsement of bills of exchange, or the number or principal sums of accountable receipts, or of notes, bills or other securities for the payment of money or warrants, or orders for payment of money, or delivery of goods. (Repealed by Criminal Statutes Repeal Act 1861 (24 & 25 Vict. c. 95))
Controverted Elections Act 1773	13 & 14 Geo. 3. c. 15 (I)	4 May 1774
An Act for making perpetual an act, entitled, "An Act to regulate the trials of controverted elections, or returns of members to serve in parliament." (Note: Controverted Elections Act 1770 (11 Geo. 3. c. 12 (I)))
Standing Mute Act 1773 (repealed)	13 & 14 Geo. 3. c. 16 (I)	4 May 1774
An Act for the more effectual proceeding against persons standing mute on arraignment for murder, felony, or piracy. (Repealed by Criminal Statutes (Ireland) Repeal Act 1828 (9 Geo. 4. c. 53))
Dublin Foundling Hospital Act 1773 (repealed)	13 & 14 Geo. 3. c. 17 (I)	2 June 1774
An Act for granting to His Majesty, His Heirs and Successors, the yearly Sums therein mentioned, and for the better support of the Foundling Hospital and Workhouse of the City of Dublin, and for increasing the Fund thereof. (Repealed by Statute Law Revision (Ireland) Act 1879 (42 & 43 Vict. c. 24))
County Treasurers Act 1773 (repealed)	13 & 14 Geo. 3. c. 18 (I)	2 June 1774
An Act for the better regulating the office of county treasurers, and the duty of clerks of the crown in respect of presentments, and to enable the grand jury of the county of Wicklow to raise money by presentment for the purchasing of ground or houses adjoining to the court house of said county, for the purpose of building additions to the said court house. (Repealed by Statute Law Revision (Ireland) Act 1879 (42 & 43 Vict. c. 24))
House Valuation Act 1773 (repealed)	13 & 14 Geo. 3. c. 19 (I)	2 June 1774
An Act for the better and more certain Valuation of Houses in Counties of Cities and Counties of Towns. (Repealed by Statute Law Revision (Ireland) Act 1879 (42 & 43 Vict. c. 24))
Cities (Regulation) Act 1773 (repealed)	13 & 14 Geo. 3. c. 20 (I)	2 June 1774
An act for amending the laws relative to the lighting and cleansing of several cities, and for establishing of market juries therein; and for other purposes. (Repealed by Statute Law Revision (Ireland) Act 1879 (42 & 43 Vict. c. 24))
Linen and Hempen Manufactures Act 1773	13 & 14 Geo. 3. c. 21 (I)	2 June 1774
An act to explain and amend an act passed in the 3rd year of his present majesty's reign entitled "An act for the better regulation of the linen and hempen manufactures." (Note: Linen Manufacturers Act 1763 (3 Geo. 3. c. 34 (I)))
City of Dublin Act 1773 or the Dublin Paving Act 1774	13 & 14 Geo. 3. c. 22 (I)	2 June 1774
An Act for paving the Streets, Lanes, Quays, Bridges, Squares, Courts, and Alleys within the City and County of the City of Dublin, and other Purposes relative to the said City of Dublin, and other Places therein particularly mentioned.
Attornies Admission Act 1773 (repealed)	13 & 14 Geo. 3. c. 23 (I)	2 June 1774
An Act for the better regulation of the admission and practice of attornies. (Repealed by Statute Law Revision (Ireland) Act 1879 (42 & 43 Vict. c. 24))
Deserted Infants and Fire Prevention Act 1773	13 & 14 Geo. 3. c. 24 (I)	2 June 1774
An Act for amending two acts passed the last session, the one entitled "An Act for the relief of poor infants who are or shall be deserted by their parents," (Note: Deserted Infants (Ireland) Act 1771 (11 & 12 Geo. 3. c. 15 (I))) the other entitled "An Act for preventing the spreading of fire, and for appointing watches in cities and towns corporate, and for other purposes." (Note: Fires and Watches (Ireland) Act 1771 (11 & 12 Geo. 3. c. 14 (I)))
Protestants' Titles Act 1773 (repealed)	13 & 14 Geo. 3. c. 25 (I)	2 June 1774
An Act for amending an Act passed in the Third Year of the Reign of His present Majesty intitled "An Act for confirming the Titles and for quieting the Possession of Protestants, and for giving Time to Converts from Popery to perform the Requisites of Conformity prescribed by the Laws against Popery." (Note: Protestants' Titles Act 1763 (3 Geo. 3. c. 26 (I))) (Repealed by Statute Law Revision (Ireland) Act 1879 (42 & 43 Vict. c. 24))
Turnpike Roads Act 1773 (repealed)	13 & 14 Geo. 3. c. 26 (I)	2 June 1774
An Act for enforcing a due Execution of the Laws relative to Turnpike Roads in this Kingdom. (Repealed by Statute Law Revision (Ireland) Act 1879 (42 & 43 Vict. c. 24))
Armagh Chapels Act 1773 (repealed)	13 & 14 Geo. 3. c. 27 (I)	2 June 1774
An Act to amend an act passed in the 8th year of his present majesty entitled "An Act for erecting new chapels of ease in the parish of Armagh and making such chapels, and those that are already erected in said parish, perpetual cures, and for making a proper provision for the maintenance of perpetual curates to officiate in the same," (Note: Armagh Chapels of Ease Act 1767 (7 Geo. 3. c. 17 (I))) and for other purposes. (Repealed by Church of Ireland Acts Repeal Act 1851 (14 & 15 Vict. c. 71))
Dublin to Dunleer Road Act 1773	13 & 14 Geo. 3. c. 28 (I)	2 June 1774
An Act for amending and continuing an act passed in the 3rd year of his present majesty entitled "An Act for the more effectual amending and repairing the road leading from the city of Dublin (Note: Dublin.) to the bridge of Dunleer, (Note: Dunleer, County Louth.) and for the better securing the debts due, or to grow due, to the creditors of the said road." (Note: Dublin to Dunleer Road Act 1763 (3 Geo. 3. c. 30 (I)))
Cork to Kilworth Road Act 1773	13 & 14 Geo. 3. c. 29 (I)	2 June 1774
An Act for amending and repairing the road leading from the city of Cork (Note: Cork, County Cork.) to the brook which bounds the counties of Cork and Tipperary near the foot of Kilworth Mountain, and from thence to the road leading from the town of Clonmel (Note: Clonmel, County Tipperary.) in the county of Tipperary, through the towns of Clogheen, (Note: Clogheen, County Cork.) Mitchelstown, (Note: Mitchelstown, County Cork.) and to Doneraile (Note: Doneraile, County Cork.) in the county of Cork, and for making additional trustees for the turnpike road between Kilkenny (Note: Kilkenny, County Kilkenny.) and Callan. (Note: Callan, County Kilkenny.)
Dundalk to Dunleer Road Act 1773	13 & 14 Geo. 3. c. 30 (I)	2 June 1774
An Act for amending the road from Dundalk (Note: Dundalk, County Louth.) to Dunleer in the county of Louth.
Listowel to Limerick Road Act 1773	13 & 14 Geo. 3. c. 31 (I)	2 June 1774
An Act to continue, explain and amend an act passed in the 8th year of the reign of his present majesty King George III entitled "An Act for making and repairing the road from the town of Listowel (Note: Listowel, County Kerry.) in the county of Kerry, through the lands of Listowel, Drumin, Skehanireen, Bunegarah, Kilmeany, Curaghpholig, Knockenure, Lissenisky and Binanaspig in the county of Kerry, Atea, Taumpletlea, Glannagour, Knockfinisk, Carrigkerry, Glanduff, Glanasture, Ballyline, Ardagh Commons, Ardagh Town, Liskilleen, otherwise Liskireen, Skebana, Killscannell and Reens in the county of Limerick, ending at the forge on the said lands of Reens, at the turn of the road leading to Newcastle from Rathkeale in the said county of Limerick." (Note: Listowel to Limerick Road Act 1767 (7 Geo. 3. c. 11 (I)))
Public Roads Act 1773	13 & 14 Geo. 3. c. 32 (I)	2 June 1774
An Act for amending the Publick Roads.
Tubber to Ennis and Limerick Road Act 1773	13 & 14 Geo. 3. c. 33 (I)	2 June 1774
An Act for amending and continuing an act (Note: Tubber to Ennis and Limerick Road Act 1733 (7 Geo. 2. c. 25 (I))) for repairing the road leading from Tubber, (Note: Tubber, County Galway/Tubber, County Clare.) near the bounds of the counties of Clare and Galway, to the town of Ennis (Note: Ennis, County Clare.) in the said county of Clare, and from thence to the north liberties of the city of Limerick. (Note: Limerick, County Limerick.)
Dublin Roads and Levies Act 1773	13 & 14 Geo. 3. c. 34 (I)	2 June 1774
An Act for making and amending public roads in the county of Dublin, and for regulating the assessing, applotting and levying of money in the county of the city of Dublin.
Roman Catholic Relief Act 1773 (repealed)	13 & 14 Geo. 3. c. 35 (I)	2 June 1774
An Act to enable his Majesty's subjects of whatever persuasion to testify their allegiance to him. (Repealed by Promissory Oaths Act 1871 (34 & 35 Vict. c. 48))
Armagh to Newry Road Act 1773	13 & 14 Geo. 3. c. 36 (I)	2 June 1774
An Act to continue and amend an act entitled "An Act for repairing the road leading from the town of Armagh (Note: Armagh, County Armagh.) in the county of Armagh to the town of Newry (Note: Newry, County Down.) in the county of Down." (Note: Armagh to Newry Road Act 1735 (9 Geo. 2. c. 19 (I)))
Lime Measurement Act 1773 (repealed)	13 & 14 Geo. 3. c. 37 (I)	2 June 1774
An Act for preventing Frauds in the Measurement of Lime. (Repealed by Statute Law Revision (Ireland) Act 1879 (42 & 43 Vict. c. 24))
Wine Importation Act 1773 (repealed)	13 & 14 Geo. 3. c. 38 (I)	2 June 1774
An Act to prevent the Importation of Wines in Casks under the Size of Thirty-one Gallons, except as herein excepted. (Repealed by Statute Law Revision (Ireland) Act 1879 (42 & 43 Vict. c. 24))
Dublin to Mullingar Road Act 1773	13 & 14 Geo. 3. c. 39 (I)	2 June 1774
An Act for altering, amending and making more effectual, the laws for repairing the road leading from the city of Dublin to the town of Kinnegad (Note: Kinnegad, County Westmeath.) in the county of Westmeath, and from thence to the town of Mullingar, (Note: Mullingar, County Westmeath.) and for other purposes therein mentioned.
Armagh Library Act 1773	13 & 14 Geo. 3. c. 40 (I)	2 June 1774
An Act for settling and preserving a public library in the city of Armagh for ever, and for enabling the archbishop of Armagh to appropriate parts of a piece of land contiguous to the said city to certain uses for the benefit of the inhabitants thereof, and to make long leases of the remainder.
Statutes Continuance and Dublin Trawling Act 1773	13 & 14 Geo. 3. c. 41 (I)	2 June 1774
An Act for reviving and continuing several temporary Statutes, and to prevent the destructive Practice of trawling for Fish in the Bay of Dublin.
Temporary Statutes Act 1773	13 & 14 Geo. 3. c. 42 (I)	2 June 1774
An Act for reviving continuing and amending several temporary statutes, and for other purposes therein mentioned.
Meath Hospital Act 1773^{(Republic of Ireland)}	13 & 14 Geo. 3. c. 43 (I)	2 June 1774
An Act for explaining and amending an act passed in the fifth year of his present Majesty's reign, intitled, "An Act for erecting and establishing publick infirmaries or hospitals in this kingdom." (Note: County Hospitals Act 1765 (5 Geo. 3. c. 20 (I)))
Insolvent Debtors Act 1773 (repealed)	13 & 14 Geo. 3. c. 44 (I)	2 June 1774
An Act to amend an Act passed the last Session of Parliament intitled "An Act for the Relief of the Insolvent Debtors named in the annexed Schedules." (Note: Insolvent Debtors (Ireland) Act 1771 (11 & 12 Geo. 3. c. 32 (I))) (Repealed by Statute Law Revision (Ireland) Act 1879 (42 & 43 Vict. c. 24))
Malicious Wounding (Chalkers) Act 1773 (repealed)	13 & 14 Geo. 3. c. 45 (I)	2 June 1774
An Act to prevent malicious cutting and wounding and to punish offenders called chalkers. (Repealed by Offences Against the Person (Ireland) Act 1829 (10 Geo. 4. c. 34))
Poor Relief (Badging) Act 1773	13 & 14 Geo. 3. c. 46 (I)	2 June 1774
An Act for amending an act made the last session of parliament entitled "An Act for badging such poor as shall be found unable to support themselves by labour, and otherwise providing for them, and for restraining such as shall be found able to support themselves by labour or industry from begging." (Note: Badging and Begging (Ireland) Act 1771 (11 & 12 Geo. 3. c. 30 (I)))
Dublin Baking Trade Act 1773	13 & 14 Geo. 3. c. 47 (I)	2 June 1774
An Act for the better regulation of the baking trade in the city of Dublin.

=== Private acts ===
Short title, or popular name	Citation	Royal assent
Long title
Lord Eyre's Estate Act 1773	13 & 14 Geo. 3. c. 1 Pr. (I)	28 January 1774
An Act for explaining and amending an act entitled "An Act for vesting part of the settled estate of the Right Honourable John, Lord Eyre, baron of Eyre Court, in trustees, and their heirs, to be sold in lieu and stead of part of the said settled estate, and for other purposes." (Note: Lord Eyre's Estate Act 1771 (11 & 12 Geo. 3. c. 2 Pr. (I)))
Gardiner's Estate Act 1773	13 & 14 Geo. 3. c. 2 Pr. (I)	2 June 1774
An Act to enable Luke Gardiner, esquire, to make leases for long terms of several parts of the estate in the county and county of the city of Dublin devised to him by the Right Honourable Luke Gardiner, the elder, deceased, and also to make a provision for the younger children of the Right Honourable Charles Gardiner, deceased, and for other purposes.
Bishop of Cork's Estate Act 1773	13 & 14 Geo. 3. c. 3 Pr. (I)	2 June 1774
An Act to enable the right honourable earl of Roden and the Right Honourable and Right Reverend Isaac, lord bishop of Cork and Ross to raise by sale or mortgage of the town and lands within mentioned, or a competent part thereof, the sum of £9,000, also to sell and dispose of the fee of inheritance of certain other towns and lands, and certain freehold and leasehold interests within also mentioned, in order to augment a fund for payment of the encumbrances and charges affecting the estate and lands of John Bloomfield, esquire, pursuant to the trusts and directions in his will, and for other purposes.
Tenison's Estate Act 1773	13 & 14 Geo. 3. c. 4 Pr. (I)	2 June 1774
An Act for vesting in trustees as well the unsettled as the settled estates of Thomas Tenison of Rosefield in the county of Monaghan, esquire, in order that a competent part thereof may be sold for payment of debts and encumbrances, and for explain, amending and more effectually carrying into execution an act made in the 11th and 12th years of his present majesty's reign entitled an act for vesting in trustees the settled estate of Thomas Tenison of Rosefield in the county of Monaghan, esquire, in order that a competent part thereof may be sold for payment of debts and encumbrances.
Burton's Estate Act 1773	13 & 14 Geo. 3. c. 5 Pr. (I)	2 June 1774
An Act for the sale of a competent part of the settled estate of William Burton of Burton Hall in the county of Carlow, esquire, for payment of his debts and encumbrances, and to confirm certain articles of agreement between Graves Chamney of Finstown in the county of Dublin, esquire, and Benjamin Burton, late of Burton Hall in the county of Carlow, esquire, deceased, and the said William Burton for the exchange of lands, and for other purposes therein mentioned.
Denny's Estate Act 1773	13 & 14 Geo. 3. c. 6 Pr. (I)	2 June 1774
An Act to enable Barry Denny of Tralee in the county of Kerry, esquire, and certain other persons, to make leases of certain messuages, lands, tenements and hereditaments.
Preston's Estate Act 1773	13 & 14 Geo. 3. c. 7 Pr. (I)	2 June 1774
An Act to enable John Preston, esquire, for the consideration therein mentioned, to charge his estates in the counties of Meath and Queen's County with a further sum for payment of debts.

=== Sources ===
- "Acts of Parliament by Session: 1773". Irish Legislation Database. Queen's University Belfast.
- "Pre-Union Irish Statutes: 1773 Acts". Irish Statute Book. Attorney General of Ireland.

== 15 & 16 Geo. 3 (1775) ==
The 5th session of the 2nd parliament of George III, which met from 10 October 1775 to 4 April 1776.

This session was also traditionally cited as 15 & 16 G. 3.

=== Public acts ===
Short title, or popular name	Citation	Royal assent
Long title
Loan Duties Act 1775 (repealed)	15 & 16 Geo. 3. c. 1 (I)	25 December 1775
An Act for granting unto his majesty the several duties, rates, impositions and taxes therein particularly expressed to be applied to pay an interest at the rate of four per cent per annum for such part of the several principal sums formerly borrowed as shall remain unpaid on the 25th day of December 1775, and for other purposes as therein mentioned. (Repealed by Statute Law Revision (Ireland) Act 1879 (42 & 43 Vict. c. 24))
Annuities Act 1775 (repealed)	15 & 16 Geo. 3. c. 2 (I)	25 December 1775
An Act for granting annuities in the manner therein provided to such persons as shall voluntarily subscribe towards raising a sum not exceeding the sum of £175,000. (Repealed by Statute Law Revision (Ireland) Act 1879 (42 & 43 Vict. c. 24))
Additional Duties Act 1775 (repealed)	15 & 16 Geo. 3. c. 3 (I)	25 December 1775
An Act for granting to his Majesty an additional duty upon the several goods and merchandizes therein mentioned. (Repealed by Statute Law Revision (Ireland) Act 1879 (42 & 43 Vict. c. 24))
Flax Seeds Act 1775 (repealed)	15 & 16 Geo. 3. c. 4 (I)	25 December 1775
An Act to prevent frauds in obtaining the premiums for flax feed imported into this kingdom. (Repealed by Statute Law Revision (Ireland) Act 1879 (42 & 43 Vict. c. 24))
Qualification Indemnity Act 1775 (repealed)	15 & 16 Geo. 3. c. 5 (I)	25 December 1775
An Act for allowing further time to persons in offices or employments to qualify themselves pursuant to an act entitled "An Act to prevent the further growth of Popery." (Note: Popery Act 1703 (2 Anne c. 6 (I))) (Repealed by Statute Law Revision (Ireland) Act 1879 (42 & 43 Vict. c. 24))
Dundalk to Dunleer Road Act 1775	15 & 16 Geo. 3. c. 6 (I)	25 December 1775
An Act to explain and amend an act passed last sessions of parliament, entitled, "An Act for amending the road from Dundalk (Note: Dundalk, County Louth.) to Dunleer (Note: Dunleer, County Louth.) in the county of Lowth." (Note: Dundalk to Dunleer Road Act 1773 (13 & 14 Geo. 3. c. 30 (I)))
Flaxen and Hempen Manufactures Act 1775 (repealed)	15 & 16 Geo. 3. c. 7 (I)	25 December 1775
An Act to amend an act passed in the 3rd year of his present majesty entitled "An Act for continuing the encouragement given by former acts of parliament to the flaxen and hempen manufactures." (Note: Flaxen and Hempen Manufactures Act 1763 (3 Geo. 3. c. 12 (I))) (Repealed by Statute Law Revision (Ireland) Act 1879 (42 & 43 Vict. c. 24))
Additional Duties (No. 2) Act 1775 (repealed)	15 & 16 Geo. 3. c. 8 (I)	8 January 1776
An Act for granting unto his majesty an additional duty on the several commodities, goods and merchandises therein mentioned, and for prohibiting the importation of all gold and silver lace, and of all cambrics and lawns, except of the manufacture of Great Britain. (Repealed by Statute Law Revision (Ireland) Act 1879 (42 & 43 Vict. c. 24))
Stamp Duties Act 1775	15 & 16 Geo. 3. c. 9 (I)	8 January 1776
An Act for granting unto his Majesty, his heirs and successors, several duties upon stamped vellum, parchment, and paper. (Repealed by Statute Law Revision (Ireland) Act 1879 (42 & 43 Vict. c. 24))
Additional Duties (Amendment) Act 1775 (repealed)	15 & 16 Geo. 3. c. 10 (I)	7 March 1776
An Act for explaining an act entitled "An Act for granting unto his majesty an additional duty on the several commodities, goods and merchandises therein mentioned, and for prohibiting the importation of all gold and silver lace, and of all cambrics and lawns, except of the manufacture of Great Britain." (Note: Additional Duties (No. 2) Act 1775 (15 & 16 Geo. 3. c. 8 (I))) (Repealed by Statute Law Revision (Ireland) Act 1879 (42 & 43 Vict. c. 24))
Writs During Recess Act 1775 (repealed)	15 & 16 Geo. 3. c. 11 (I)	7 March 1776
An Act to explain and amend an act made in the 11th year of the reign of his present majesty entitled "An Act to enable the speaker of the house of commons to issue his warrants to make out new writs for the choice of members to serve in parliament in the room of such members as shall die during the recess of parliament, and for enabling the speaker of the house of commons to make out new writs for the choice of members to serve in parliament in the room of such members as shall during the recess of parliament become peers of Ireland, and be summoned to parliament." (Note: Writs During Recess Act 1770 (11 Geo. 3. c. 10 (I))) (Repealed by Statute Law Revision (Ireland) Act 1879 (42 & 43 Vict. c. 24))
Athy to Leighlinbridge Road Act 1775 (repealed)	15 & 16 Geo. 3. c. 12 (I)	7 March 1776
An Act for altering and amending an act made in the 25th year of his late majesty King George II entitled "An Act for making and repairing a road leading from the town of Athy (Note: Athy, County Kildare.) in the county of Kildare, through part of the Queen's County, and through the town of Castlecomer (Note: Castlecomer, County Kilkenny.) in the county of Kilkenny, to the town of Old Leighlin (Note: Old Leighlin, County Carlow.) in the county of Carlow, and from thence to and through the town of Leighlinbridge." (Note: Leighlinbridge, County Carlow.) (Note: Athy to Leighlinbridge Road Act 1751 (25 Geo. 2. c. 19 (I))) (Repealed by Athy and Leighlin Bridge, and Carlow and Castlecomer Roads Act 1808 (48 Geo. 3. c. lv))
Kilcullen to Timahoe Road Act 1775	15 & 16 Geo. 3. c. 13 (I)	7 March 1776
An Act for altering, amending and making more effectual an act entitled "An Act for repairing the road leading from the green of Kilcullen (Note: Kilcullen, County Kildare.) in the county of Kildare to the town of Athy in the same county, and from thence through the town of Stradbally (Note: Stradbally, County Laois.) to the town of Timahoe (Note: Timahoe, County Laois.) in the Queen's County." (Note: Kilcullen to Timahoe Road Act 1735 (9 Geo. 2. c. 23 (I)))
Churches Repair Act 1775 (repealed)	15 & 16 Geo. 3. c. 14 (I)	7 March 1776
An Act for repealing an act made in the 13th and 14th years of the reign of his present majesty (Note: Churches Repair Act 1773 (13 & 14 Geo. 3. c. 10 (I))) entitled "An Act to explain and amend an act made in the 3rd year of the reign of his late majesty King George II (Note: Churches Repair Act 1729 (3 Geo. 2. c. 11 (I))) entitled 'An Act for better keeping churches in repair,'" and for other purposes. (Repealed by Statute Law Revision (Ireland) Act 1879 (42 & 43 Vict. c. 24))
Revenue Improvement Act 1775 (repealed)	15 & 16 Geo. 3. c. 15 (I)	25 March 1776
An Act for the improvement of his majesty's revenue, and the more effectual preventing frauds therein, and for continuing and amending several laws heretofore made and now in force relative to his majesty's revenue. (Repealed by Statute Law Revision (Ireland) Act 1879 (42 & 43 Vict. c. 24))
Parliamentary Elections Act 1775	15 & 16 Geo. 3. c. 16 (I)	25 March 1776
An Act for better regulating the elections of members to serve in parliament.
Glebe Lands and Churches Endowment Act 1775	15 & 16 Geo. 3. c. 17 (I)	25 March 1776
An Act to explain and amend the several statutes in force in this kingdom, relative to the exchange of glebe lands, and the endowment of churches with new glebes, and to remove some doubts relative to the said statutes, and for other purposes.
Hawkers and Pedlars Act 1775 (repealed)	15 & 16 Geo. 3. c. 18 (I)	4 April 1776
An Act for licensing Hawkers and Pedlars, and for the encouragement of English Protestant Schools. (Repealed by Statute Law Revision (Ireland) Act 1879 (42 & 43 Vict. c. 24))
Fisheries Act 1775	15 & 16 Geo. 3. c. 19 (I)	4 April 1776
An Act for the improvement of the fisheries of this kingdom.
City of Dublin Act 1775^{(Republic of Ireland)}	15 & 16 Geo. 3. c. 20 (I)	4 April 1776
An Act to explain and amend an act, entitled, "An act for paving the streets, lanes, quays, bridges, squares, courts, and alleys, within the city and county of the city of Dublin, and other purposes relative to the said city of Dublin, and other places therein particularly mentioned;" (Note: City of Dublin Act 1773 (13 & 14 Geo. 3. c. 22 (I))) and for extending the provisions of the said act to the baronies of saint Sepulchre's and Donore.
Tumultuous Risings Act 1775^{(Republic of Ireland)} or Whiteboys Act	15 & 16 Geo. 3. c. 21 (I)	4 April 1776
An Act to prevent and punish tumultuous risings of persons within this kingdom, and for other purposes therein mentioned.
Dublin Baking Trade Act 1775	15 & 16 Geo. 3. c. 22 (I)	4 April 1776
An Act for amending an act passed last session of parliament, entitled, "An Act for the better regulation of the baking trade in the city of Dublin." (Note: Dublin Baking Trade Act 1773 (13 & 14 Geo. 3. c. 47 (I)))
Kilmainham Hospital Act 1775 (repealed)	15 & 16 Geo. 3. c. 23 (I)	4 April 1776
An Act for the relief of the out pensioners of the hospital of king Charles the second for antient and maimed officers and soldiers of the army of Ireland. (Repealed by Statute Law Revision (Ireland) Act 1879 (42 & 43 Vict. c. 24))
City of Dublin (No. 2) Act 1775	15 & 16 Geo. 3. c. 24 (I)	4 April 1776
An Act for the better regulating the pipe water of the city of Dublin.
Dublin Foundling Hospital Act 1775 (repealed)	15 & 16 Geo. 3. c. 25 (I)	4 April 1776
An Act for amending an Act passed in the Eleventh and Twelfth Years of His present Majesty's Reign, intituled, "An Act for better regulating the Foundling Hospital and Workhouse of the City of Dublin, and increasing the Fund for the Support thereof; also for making a Provision for appointing a Locum Tenens, in case of the Death or Absence of the Lord Mayor, or the President of the Court of Conscience." (Note: Dublin Foundling Hospital Act 1771 (11 & 12 Geo. 3. c. 11 (I))) (Repealed by Statute Law Revision (Ireland) Act 1879 (42 & 43 Vict. c. 24))
Timber Act 1775^{(Republic of Ireland)}	15 & 16 Geo. 3. c. 26 (I)	4 April 1776
An Act for encouraging the cultivation and for the better preservation of trees, shrubs, plants, and roots.
Prevention of Frauds by Tenants Act 1775 (repealed)	15 & 16 Geo. 3. c. 27 (I)	4 April 1776
An Act to amend the several Acts of Parliament made in this Kingdom for the more effectual preventing of Frauds by Tenants. (Repealed by Landlord and Tenant Law Amendment (Ireland) Act 1860 (23 & 24 Vict. c. 154))
Dublin Approaches Act 1775	15 & 16 Geo. 3. c. 28 (I)	4 April 1776
An Act to explain and amend an act passed in the 3rd year of his present majesty entitled "An Act for making more convenient the approaches to the city of Dublin by making a new turnpike road on the south side, the west side and the north side of the said city, to commence at the road leading from Dublin to Donnybrook, and to terminate at Cavendish Street." (Note: Dublin Approaches Act 1763 (3 Geo. 3. c. 36 (I)))
Trial of Peers Act 1775 (repealed)	15 & 16 Geo. 3. c. 29 (I)	4 April 1776
An Act for regulating of trials of peers or peeresses in cases of capital offences. (Repealed by Statute Law Revision (Ireland) Act 1879 (42 & 43 Vict. c. 24))
Privilege of Parliament Act 1775 (repealed)	15 & 16 Geo. 3. c. 30 (I)	4 April 1776
An act for continuing an Act, entitled, "An Act for the further preventing Delays of Justice by reason of Privilege of Parliament." (Note: Privilege of Parliament Act 1771 (11 & 12 Geo. 3. c. 12 (I))) (Repealed by Statute Law Revision (Ireland) Act 1879 (42 & 43 Vict. c. 24))
Meath Hospital Act 1775^{(Republic of Ireland)}	15 & 16 Geo. 3. c. 31 (I)	4 April 1776
An Act for amending and rendering more effectual an act passed in the last session of parliament, (Note: Statutes Continuance and Dublin Trawling Act 1773 (13 & 14 Geo. 3. c. 41 (I))) entitled, "An Act for reviving and continuing several temporary statutes and to prevent the destructive practice of trawling for fish in the bay of Dublin;" and for explaining and amending one other act made in the thirteenth and fourteenth years of the reign of his present Majesty, (Note: Meath Hospital Act 1773 (13 & 14 Geo. 3. c. 43 (I))) entitled, "An Act for explaining and amending an act passed in the fifth year of his present Majesty's reign, (Note: County Hospitals Act 1765 (5 Geo. 3. c. 20 (I))) entitled, 'An act for erecting and establishing infirmaries or hospitals in this kingdom.'"
Expiring Statutes Continuance Act 1775 (repealed)	15 & 16 Geo. 3. c. 32 (I)	4 April 1776
An Act for reviving, amending, and continuing several temporary statutes, and for other purposes therein mentioned. (Repealed by Statute Law Revision (Ireland) Act 1879 (42 & 43 Vict. c. 24))
Wrecked Ships Act 1775 (repealed)	15 & 16 Geo. 3. c. 33 (I)	4 April 1776
For the more effectually preventing the plundering of ships or vessels, which may be wrecked or stranded on the coasts of this kingdom. (Repealed by Criminal Statutes (Ireland) Repeal Act 1828 (9 Geo. 4. c. 53))
Burning of Lime Act 1775 (repealed)	15 & 16 Geo. 3. c. 34 (I)	4 April 1776
To prohibit the burning of lime or limestones in any lime kiln which had not been erected before the 24th day of March 1772. (Repealed by Statute Law Revision (Ireland) Act 1879 (42 & 43 Vict. c. 24))
Poor Relief (Limerick and Coleraine) Act 1775 (repealed)	15 & 16 Geo. 3. c. 35 (I)	4 April 1776
An Act for amending an act made in the 11 and 12th years of his present majesty's reign entitled "An Act for badging such poor as shall be found unable to support themselves by labour industry from begging," (Note: Badging and Begging (Ireland) Act 1771 (11 & 12 Geo. 3. c. 30 (I))) so far as the said act relates to the county of Limerick, and to the county of the city of Limerick, and for extending the provisions of the said law to the town of Coleraine in the county of Londonderry. (Repealed by Statute Law Revision (Ireland) Act 1879 (42 & 43 Vict. c. 24))
Road from Timahoe to Tipperary Act 1775	15 & 16 Geo. 3. c. 36 (I)	4 April 1776
An Act for continuing, amending and making more effectual an act passed in the 13th year of the reign of his present majesty King George II entitled "An Act for repairing the road from Timahoe (Note: Timahoe, County Laois.) in the Queen's County, through Ballynakill, (Note: Ballinakill, County Laois.) Durrow, (Note: Durrow, County Laois.) Beggars' Inn, and from thence through the city of Cashel (Note: Cashel, County Tipperary.) to the town of Tipperary (Note: Tipperary, County Tipperary.) in the county of Tipperary." (Note: Road from Timahoe to Tipperary Act 1739 (13 Geo. 2. c. 14 (I)))
Dublin to Navan, Nobber, and Kells Road Act 1775	15 & 16 Geo. 3. c. 37 (I)	4 April 1776
An Act for continuing an act passed in the seventh year of the reign of his late Majesty king George the second (Note: Dublin to Navan, Nobber, and Kells Road Act 1733 (7 Geo. 2. c. 22 (I))) entitled, "An act for making more effectual an act passed in the third year of the reign of his present Majesty king George the second, (Note: Dublin to Navan Road Act 1729 (3 Geo. 2. c. 19 (I))) intituled, 'An Act for repairing the road leading from the city of Dublin (Note: Dublin.) to the town of Navan (Note: Navan, County Meath.) in the county of Meath,' and for repairing the roads leading from the said town of Navan to the town of Nobber (Note: Nobber, County Meath.) in the said county; as also for repairing the road leading from the said town of Navan to the town of Kells (Note: Kells, County Meath.) in the said county."
Vaughan's Charity Act 1775	15 & 16 Geo. 3. c. 38 (I)	4 April 1776
An Act for confirming and establishing an agreement made between the surviving trustees named in, or elected and appointed, pursuant to the last will and codicil of George Vaughan, esquire, deceased, and the surviving devisees named in the said will, concerning the real and personal estates whereof the said George Vaughan died seised or possessed, and for making the said agreement effectual, and for incorporating the said trustees, for the better execution of such of the charities appointed by the said will as can be maintained, and for other purposes.

=== Private acts ===
Short title, or popular name	Citation	Royal assent
Long title
Burgh's Estate Act 1775	15 & 16 Geo. 3. c. 1 Pr. (I)	7 March 1776
An Act for confirming and establishing an agreement made between John Wolfe and Walter Burgh, esquire, concerning the real estate whereof Richard Burgh, formerly of Dumkeene in the county of Limerick and late of the city of Dublin, esquire, deceased, died seised, and for preventing all suits concerning the will of said Richard Burgh, and for other purposes.
Earl of Anglesey's Estate Act 1775	15 & 16 Geo. 3. c. 2 Pr. (I)	4 April 1776
An Act for vesting manors, lands, tenements and hereditaments, late the estate of the Right Honourable Richard, earl of Anglesey, in trustees for raising a sufficient sum of money for discharging certain incumbrances affecting the same.

=== Sources ===
- "Acts of Parliament by Session: 1775". Irish Legislation Database. Queen's University Belfast.
- "Pre-Union Irish Statutes: 1775 Acts". Irish Statute Book. Attorney General of Ireland.

== 16 Geo. 3 (1776) ==
The 1st session of the 3rd parliament of George III, which met from 18 June 1776 to 20 June 1776.

=== Public acts ===
Short title, or popular name	Citation	Royal assent
Long title
Qualification Indemnity Act 1776 (repealed)	16 Geo. 3. c. 1 (I)	20 June 1776
An Act for continuing an act (Note: Qualification Indemnity Act 1775 (15 & 16 Geo. 3. c. 5 (I))) entitled "An Act for allowing further time to persons in offices or employments to qualify themselves pursuant to an act (Note: Popery Act 1703 (2 Anne c. 6 (I))) entitled 'An Act to prevent the further growth of Popery.'" (Repealed by Statute Law Revision (Ireland) Act 1879 (42 & 43 Vict. c. 24))

=== Sources ===
- "The sixteenth year of George III". The Statutes at Large, Passed in the Parliaments held in Ireland. Vol. XI: Statutes that have passed from the Seventeenth Year of George the Third, to the Twentieth Year, inclusive. Dublin: King's Printer. 1782. p. 1 – via Google Books.
- "Acts of Parliament by Session: 1776". Irish Legislation Database. Queen's University Belfast.

== 17 & 18 Geo. 3 (1777) ==
The 2nd session of the 3rd parliament of George III, which met from 14 October 1777 to 14 August 1778.

This session was also traditionally cited as 17 & 28 G. 3.

=== Public acts ===
Short title, or popular name	Citation	Royal assent
Long title
Additional Duties Act 1777 (repealed)	17 & 18 Geo. 3. c. 1 (I)	24 December 1777
An Act for granting unto his majesty an additional duty on beer, ale, strong waters, wine tobacco, hides and other goods and merchandises therein mentioned, and for prohibiting the importation of all gold and silver lace, and of all cambrics and lawns, except of the manufacture of Great Britain. (Repealed by Statute Law Revision (Ireland) Act 1879 (42 & 43 Vict. c. 24))
Loan Duties Act 1777 (repealed)	17 & 18 Geo. 3. c. 2 (I)	24 December 1777
An Act for granting unto his majesty the several duties, rates, impositions and taxes therein particularly expressed to be applied to the payment of the interest of the sums therein provided for, and towards the discharge of the said principal sums in such manner as therein is directed, and for such other purposes as are therein mentioned. (Repealed by Statute Law Revision (Ireland) Act 1879 (42 & 43 Vict. c. 24))
Stamp Duties Act 1777 (repealed)	17 & 18 Geo. 3. c. 3 (I)	24 December 1777
An Act for granting unto his majesty, his heirs and successors several duties upon stamped vellum, parchment and paper. (Repealed by Statute Law Revision (Ireland) Act 1879 (42 & 43 Vict. c. 24))
Additional Duties (No. 2) Act 1777 (repealed)	17 & 18 Geo. 3. c. 4 (I)	24 December 1777
An Act for granting to his Majesty an additional duty upon the several goods and merchandizes therein mentioned. (Repealed by Statute Law Revision (Ireland) Act 1879 (42 & 43 Vict. c. 24))
Qualification Indemnity Act 1777 (repealed)	17 & 18 Geo. 3. c. 5 (I)	24 December 1777
An Act for allowing further time to persons in offices or employments to qualify themselves pursuant to an act entitled "An Act to prevent the further growth of Popery." (Note: Popery Act 1703 (2 Anne c. 6 (I))) (Repealed by Statute Law Revision (Ireland) Act 1879 (42 & 43 Vict. c. 24))
Hawkers and Pedlars Act 1777 (repealed)	17 & 18 Geo. 3. c. 6 (I)	24 March 1778
An Act for licensing hawkers and pedlars, and for the encouragement of English protestant schools. (Repealed by Statute Law Revision (Ireland) Act 1879 (42 & 43 Vict. c. 24))
Flaxen and Hempen Manufactures Act 1777 (repealed)	17 & 18 Geo. 3. c. 7 (I)	24 March 1778
An Act to continue an act (Note: Flaxen and Hempen Manufactures Act 1775 (15 & 16 Geo. 3. c. 7 (I))) entitled "An Act to amend an act passed in the 3rd year of his present majesty (Note: Flaxen and Hempen Manufactures Act 1763 (3 Geo. 3. c. 12 (I))) entitled 'An Act for continuing the encouragement given by former acts of parliament to the flaxen and hempen manufactures.'" (Repealed by Statute Law Revision (Ireland) Act 1879 (42 & 43 Vict. c. 24))
Revenue Improvement Act 1777 (repealed)	17 & 18 Geo. 3. c. 8 (I)	11 June 1778
An Act for the improvement of his majesty's revenue, and the more effectual preventing frauds therein, and for continuing and amending several laws heretofore made and now in force relative to his majesty's revenue. (Repealed by Statute Law Revision (Ireland) Act 1879 (42 & 43 Vict. c. 24))
Hard Labour Act 1777 (repealed)	17 & 18 Geo. 3. c. 9 (I)	11 June 1778
An Act to authorise for a limited time the punishment by hard labour of offenders who for certain crimes are or shall become liable to be transported to any of his majesty's colonies and plantations. (Repealed by Statute Law Revision (Ireland) Act 1879 (42 & 43 Vict. c. 24))
Circular Road Act 1777	17 & 18 Geo. 3. c. 10 (I)	11 June 1778
An Act for making and keeping in repair a circular road round the city of Dublin.
Malicious Cutting and Wounding Act 1777 (repealed)	17 & 18 Geo. 3. c. 11 (I)	11 June 1778
An Act for continuing an act passed in the 14th year of his present majesty's reign entitled "An Act to prevent malicious cutting and wounding, and to punish offenders called chalkers." (Note: Malicious Wounding (Chalkers) Act 1773 (13 & 14 Geo. 3. c. 45 (I))) (Repealed by Statute Law Revision (Ireland) Act 1879 (42 & 43 Vict. c. 24))
Charitable Musical Society Act 1777	17 & 18 Geo. 3. c. 12 (I)	11 June 1778
An Act for incorporating the Charitable Musical Society for lending out money interest-free to indigent and industrious tradesmen.
Militia Act 1777 (repealed)	17 & 18 Geo. 3. c. 13 (I)	1 July 1778
An Act for establishing a militia in this kingdom. (Repealed by Statute Law Revision (Ireland) Act 1879 (42 & 43 Vict. c. 24))
Insolvent Debtors Relief Act 1777 (repealed)	17 & 18 Geo. 3. c. 14 (I)	1 July 1778
An Act for the relief of insolvent debtors. (Repealed by Statute Law Revision (Ireland) Act 1879 (42 & 43 Vict. c. 24))
County Hospitals Act 1777^{(Republic of Ireland)}	17 & 18 Geo. 3. c. 15 (I)	11 June 1778
An Act to enable testamentary guardians of minors to make leases for the purpose of building county infirmaries and hospitals on the estates of such minors, subject to the restrictions herein after mentioned.
Inland Navigation Act 1777 (repealed)	17 & 18 Geo. 3. c. 16 (I)	1 July 1778
An Act for granting and continuing to his majesty the several duties, rates and impositions therein contained, for the use of the Corporation for promoting and carrying on an Inland Navigation in Ireland. (Repealed by Statute Law Revision (Ireland) Act 1879 (42 & 43 Vict. c. 24))
Dublin Baking Trade Act 1777	17 & 18 Geo. 3. c. 17 (I)	1 July 1778
An Act to continue and amend an act passed in the 13th and 14th years of his present majesty entitled "An Act for the better regulating the baking trade of the city of Dublin, and for other purposes." (Note: Dublin Baking Trade Act 1773 (13 & 14 Geo. 3. c. 47 (I)))
Whale Fisheries Act 1777 (repealed)	17 & 18 Geo. 3. c. 18 (I)	1 July 1778
An Act for the further encouragement of the whale fisheries carried on from Ireland. (Repealed by Statute Law Revision (Ireland) Act 1879 (42 & 43 Vict. c. 24))
Inland Fisheries Act 1777 (repealed)	17 & 18 Geo. 3. c. 19 (I)	1 July 1778
An Act for the better preservation of fish in rivers, lakes, and inland waters. (Repealed by Fisheries (Ireland) Act 1842 (5 & 6 Vict. c. 106))
Fisheries Amendment Act 1777	17 & 18 Geo. 3. c. 20 (I)	1 July 1778
An Act to explain and amend the acts made for the encouragement of the fisheries of this kingdom, and for promoting the good ends proposed by the said laws.
Linen and Hempen Manufactures Act 1777	17 & 18 Geo. 3. c. 21 (I)	1 July 1778
An Act to explain and amend an act passed in the 3rd year of the reign of his present majesty entitled "An Act for the better regulation of the linen and hempen manufactures." (Note: Linen Manufacturers Act 1763 (3 Geo. 3. c. 34 (I)))
Public Roads Amendment Act 1777	17 & 18 Geo. 3. c. 22 (I)	1 July 1778
An Act to explain and amend an act passed in the 13th and 14th years of his majesty's reign entitled "An Act for amending the public roads." (Note: Public Roads Act 1773 (13 & 14 Geo. 3. c. 32 (I)))
Turnpike Roads Act 1777 (repealed)	17 & 18 Geo. 3. c. 23 (I)	1 July 1778
An Act to amend an act entitled "An Act for enforcing the execution of the laws relative to turnpike roads in this kingdom." (Note: Turnpike Roads Act 1773 (13 & 14 Geo. 3. c. 26 (I))) (Repealed by Statute Law Revision (Ireland) Act 1879 (42 & 43 Vict. c. 24))
Dublin Cattle Driving Act 1777 (repealed)	17 & 18 Geo. 3. c. 24 (I)	1 July 1778
An Act to prevent the mischiefs that arise from driving cattle within the city of Dublin and liberties thereof. (Repealed by Statute Law Revision (Ireland) Act 1879 (42 & 43 Vict. c. 24))
Act of Faculties Explanation Act 1777 (repealed)	17 & 18 Geo. 3. c. 25 (I)	1 July 1778
An Act to explain the statute of the 28th year of Henry VIII (Note: Act of Faculties 1537 (28 Hen. 8. c. 19 (I))) entitled the act of faculties. (Repealed by Statute Law Revision (Ireland) Act 1879 (42 & 43 Vict. c. 24))
Controverted Elections Act 1777	17 & 18 Geo. 3. c. 26 (I)	1 July 1778
An Act to explain and amend an act passed in the 11th year of the reign of his present majesty entitled "An Act to regulate the trials of controverted elections, or returns of members to serve in parliament." (Note: Controverted Elections Act 1770 (11 Geo. 3. c. 12 (I)))
Dublin Wide Streets Act 1777 (repealed)	17 & 18 Geo. 3. c. 27 (I)	1 July 1778
An Act to direct the application of the sum of £5,000 granted this session to the commissioners appointed by act of parliament for making wide and convenient passages through the city of Dublin. (Repealed by Statute Law Revision (Ireland) Act 1879 (42 & 43 Vict. c. 24))
Prisoners Health Act 1777 (repealed)	17 & 18 Geo. 3. c. 28 (I)	1 July 1778
An Act for preserving the health of prisoners in gaol, and preventing the gaol distemper. (Repealed by Prisons (Ireland) Act 1810 (50 Geo. 3. c. 103))
Dublin Corn and Flour Supply Act 1777 (repealed)	17 & 18 Geo. 3. c. 29 (I)	1 July 1778
An Act for explaining a doubt arising on the laws for supplying the city of Dublin with corn and flour, and also for lessening the expense of supplying said city the articles aforesaid. (Repealed by Statute Law Revision (Ireland) Act 1879 (42 & 43 Vict. c. 24))
Quarantine Act 1777 (repealed)	17 & 18 Geo. 3. c. 30 (I)	1 July 1778
An Act to continue an act passed in the 11th year of his present majesty's reign entitled "An Act to oblige ships more effectually to perform their quarantine, and for the better preventing the plague being brought from foreign parts into Ireland, and to hinder the spreading of infection." (Note: Quarantine Act 1770 (11 Geo. 3. c. 11 (I))) (Repealed by Statute Law Revision (Ireland) Act 1879 (42 & 43 Vict. c. 24))
Tillage Act 1777 (repealed)	17 & 18 Geo. 3. c. 31 (I)	1 July 1778
An Act for continuing an act (Note: Tillage Act 1773 (13 & 14 Geo. 3. c. 11 (I))) entitled "An Act for amending an act passed in the 29th year of the reign of his late majesty King George II (Note: Tillage Act 1755 (29 Geo. 2. c. 9 (I))) entitled 'An Act for the further encouragement of tillage.'" (Repealed by Statute Law Revision (Ireland) Act 1879 (42 & 43 Vict. c. 24))
Dublin Bread and Provisions Act 1777 (repealed)	17 & 18 Geo. 3. c. 32 (I)	1 July 1778
An Act for regulating the price and assize of bread, and preventing frauds and impositions in the sale of flour, meal, potatoes, butchers' meat, and other articles in the county of Dublin. (Repealed by Statute Law Revision (Ireland) Act 1879 (42 & 43 Vict. c. 24))
Destruction of Manufactured Goods Act 1777	17 & 18 Geo. 3. c. 33 (I)	1 July 1778
An Act for preventing the cutting or destroying of plain, stained or printed linens, cottons, lawns or muslins, or any other manufactured goods.
Tillage Encouragement Act 1777 (repealed)	17 & 18 Geo. 3. c. 34 (I)	1 July 1778
An Act for the encouragement of tillage, and rendering the carriage of corn to the city of Dublin less expensive. (Repealed by Statute Law Revision (Ireland) Act 1879 (42 & 43 Vict. c. 24))
Timber Act 1777^{(Republic of Ireland)}	17 & 18 Geo. 3. c. 35 (I)	1 July 1778
An Act to explain and amend an act, passed in the sixth year of the reign of his present Majesty, intitled, "An Act for encouraging the planting of timber trees." (Note: Timber Act 1765 (5 Geo. 3. c. 17 (I)))
Tumultuous Risings (Extension) Act 1777^{(Republic of Ireland)}	17 & 18 Geo. 3. c. 36 (I)	1 July 1778
An Act for reviving and continuing several temporary statutes.
Dublin to Navan, Nobber, and Kells Road Act 1777	17 & 18 Geo. 3. c. 37 (I)	1 July 1778
An Act for continuing and amending an act passed in the 15th and 16th years of the reign of his present majesty (Note: Dublin to Navan, Nobber, and Kells Road Act 1775 (15 & 16 Geo. 3. c. 37 (I))) entitled "An Act for continuing an act passed in the 7th year of his late majesty King George II (Note: Dublin to Navan, Nobber, and Kells Road Act 1733 (7 Geo. 2. c. 22 (I))) entitled 'An Act for repairing the roads leading from the city of Dublin (Note: Dublin.) to the town of Navan (Note: Navan, County Meath.) in the county of Meath, and for repairing the roads leading from the said town of Navan to the town of Nobber (Note: Nobber, County Meath.) in the said county, as also for repairing the road leading from the said town of Navan to the town of Kells (Note: Kells, County Meath.) in the said county.'"
City of Cork Act 1777^{(Republic of Ireland)}	17 & 18 Geo. 3. c. 38 (I)	1 July 1778
An Act for the better regulation of the police of the city of Cork, and for other purposes relative to the said city.
Nenagh to Curranaboy Bridge Road Act 1777	17 & 18 Geo. 3. c. 39 (I)	1 July 1778
An Act for effectually repairing and keeping in repair the turnpike road beginning at the town of Nenagh, and passing through the towns of Birr and Firbane in the King's County, and ending at Curranaboy Bridge, in the county of Westmeath.
Maryborough to Toomevara Road Act 1777	17 & 18 Geo. 3. c. 40 (I)	14 August 1778
An Act for repairing the road leading from the town of Maryborough in the Queen's County, through the towns of Mountrath, Castletown and Borris-in-Ossory in the same county, and from thence through the town of Roscrea in the county of Tipperary, and through the town of Dunkerrin in the King's County, to the town of Toomyvara in the said county of Tipperary.
Trade Advancement Act 1777 (repealed)	17 & 18 Geo. 3. c. 41 (I)	14 August 1778
An Act for granting unto his majesty, his heirs and successors certain duties therein mentioned, and for the further advancement of the trade of this kingdom. (Repealed by Statute Law Revision (Ireland) Act 1879 (42 & 43 Vict. c. 24))
Trade Advancement (No. 2) Act 1777 (repealed)	17 & 18 Geo. 3. c. 42 (I)	14 August 1778
An Act for the advancement of the trade of this kingdom. (Repealed by Statute Law Revision (Ireland) Act 1879 (42 & 43 Vict. c. 24))
Dublin Police Act 1777	17 & 18 Geo. 3. c. 43 (I)	14 August 1778
An Act for improving the police of the city of Dublin.
Swearing of Dublin Lord Mayor Act 1777	17 & 18 Geo. 3. c. 44 (I)	14 August 1778
An Act to enable the Chief Justice, or other Justice of His Majesty's Court of King's Bench, or the Chief Justice, or other Justices of His Majesty's Court of Common Pleas, in the Absence of the Lord Chief Baron of the Court of Exchequer to swear the Lord Mayor of the City of Dublin into his Office. (Repealed for the Republic of Ireland by Statute Law Revision (Pre-Union Irish Statutes) Act 1962 (No. 29))
Outlawries Act 1777	17 & 18 Geo. 3. c. 45 (I)	14 August 1778
An Act for the Amendment of the Law, with Respect to Outlawries, returning Special Juries, and the future Effects of Bankrupts in certain Cases. (Repealed for the Republic of Ireland by Statute Law Revision (Pre-Union Irish Statutes) Act 1962 (No. 29))
Harcourt Street Act 1777^{(Republic of Ireland)}	17 & 18 Geo. 3. c. 46 (I)	14 August 1778
An Act for the further improvement of the city of Dublin in the manner therein mentioned.
St. Mary's Parish Act 1777^{(Republic of Ireland)}	17 & 18 Geo. 3. c. 47 (I)	14 August 1778
An Act for ascertaining the boundaries of the parish of Saint Mary, on the north east side thereof, and preventing inconveniencies arising from the uncertain state of the same, and for ascertaining the boundaries between the county of the city of Dublin and the county of Dublin, in some places where the same are uncertain, and thereby preventing persons guilty of offences therein from escaping the punishment of the law.
Bankrupts Act 1777	17 & 18 Geo. 3. c. 48 (I)	14 August 1778
An Act to amend an act entitled "An Act to prevent frauds committed by bankrupts," (Note: Frauds by Bankrupts Act 1771 (11 & 12 Geo. 3. c. 8 (I))) by excluding from the benefit of that law traders who shall not keep regular books of account, and also to continue the same, and for other purposes.
Leases for Lives Act 1777^{(Republic of Ireland)} or Gardiner's Act or Catholic Relief Act 1777	17 & 18 Geo. 3. c. 49 (I)	14 August 1778
An Act for the Relief of His Majesty's Subjects of this Kingdom professing the Popish Religion.

=== Private acts ===
Short title, or popular name	Citation	Royal assent
Long title
Viscount Villiers' Estate Act 1777	17 & 18 Geo. 3. c. 1 Pr. (I)	11 June 1778
An Act for vesting part of the settled estates of the Right Honourable George Villiers, commonly called Lord Viscount Villiers, of the kingdom of Ireland, situate in the county of Waterford and in the Queen's County in the same kingdom, in trustees, to be sold for the payment of certain debts and encumbrances affecting the said settled estates of the said George, Lord Viscount Villiers.
Earl of Courtown's Estate Act 1777	17 & 18 Geo. 3. c. 2 Pr. (I)	11 June 1778
An Act for vesting certain lands, tenements and hereditaments therein mentioned, part of the estate of the Right Honourable James, earl of Courtown, and of Elizabeth, countess dowager of Courtown, in trustees, to be sold for the purpose of raising a sum of £24,000 sterling, for paying the portions of the younger children of the said countess (the brothers and sisters of the said earl) and for other purposes.
Trench's Estate Act 1777	17 & 18 Geo. 3. c. 3 Pr. (I)	11 June 1778
An Act for vesting certain lands, tenements and hereditaments therein mentioned, part of the estate of William Power Keating Trench of Garbally in the county of Galway, esquire, and formerly the estate of Nicholas Keating of the city of Dublin, esquire, deceased, in trustees, to be sold for the purposes of raising a sum of £20,000 to discharge the encumbrances affecting the settled estate of the said William Power Keating Trench, and for settling the certain parts of the said settled estate to the uses mentioned in the said Nicholas Keating, in lieu of and of equal value to the lands so to be sold, and for other purposes therein mentioned.
Darcy's Estate Act 1777	17 & 18 Geo. 3. c. 4 Pr. (I)	11 June 1778
An Act to enable Patrick Darcy of Kiltullagh in the county of Galway, esquire, grand nephew and heir of Patrick Darcy late of Kiltullagh, aforesaid, esquire, deceased, to charge the lands and hereditaments in the counties of Galway and Mayo, which were the estate of the said Patrick Darcy, deceased, with a jointure or provision for his present wife, Mary Darcy, or any after taken wife, and also to enable the said Patrick Darcy, the grand nephew, and the several persons to whom remainders are limited of the estates hereinafter therein mentioned of the said Patrick Darcy, deceased, when they shall respectively become seized of the said estate to make leases thereof for three lives or thirty one years.
Lord Kingsborough's Estate Act 1777	17 & 18 Geo. 3. c. 5 Pr. (I)	1 July 1778
An Act to enable the Honourable Robert King, commonly called Lord Kingsborough, and the Caroline King, his wife, and the survivor of them to make leases of the estates of the Right Honourable James, late lord baron of Kingston, and to charge the same with any sum not exceeding £23,000 for the portions of their younger children.
Preston's Estate Act 1777	17 & 18 Geo. 3. c. 6 Pr. (I)	1 July 1778
An Act to explain and amend an act made in this kingdom in the 14th year of his present majesty's reign entitled "An Act to enable John Preston, esquire, for the consideration therein mentioned, to charge his estates in the counties of Meath and Queen's County with a further sum for payment of debts." (Note: Preston's Estate Act 1773 (13 & 14 Geo. 3. c. 7 Pr. (I)))
Earl of Carrick's Estate Act 1777	17 & 18 Geo. 3. c. 7 Pr. (I)	14 August 1778
An Act for vesting in trustees part of the estates of the Right Honourable Thomas, earl of Carrick, in order to be sold for payment of debts and encumbrances affecting the same, and for settling certain lands, part of said earl's estates in the county of in the place and stead of certain manors, towns and lands, part of his estate in the county of Down comprised in the said earl's marriage settlement, and for directing the application of the money to arise from the sale of the estate of Sarah, countess of Carrick, situate in the county of Louth.
Fitzgerald's Estate Act 1777	17 & 18 Geo. 3. c. 8 Pr. (I)	14 August 1778
An Act to enable Edward Fitzgerald of Carrigoran in the county of Clare, esquire, to charge the lands, tenements and hereditaments comprised in certain deeds of lease and release, entered into upon his marriage with his late wife, Rachel Grady, deceased, daughter of Standish Grady, the elder, then of Elton, but now of Capper Cullen in the county of Limerick, esquire, with a jointure or provision for wife or wives, to be hereafter taken by the said Edward Fitzgerald.

=== Sources ===
- "The seventeenth and eighteenth years of George III". The Statutes at Large, Passed in the Parliaments held in Ireland. Vol. XI: Statutes that have passed from the Seventeenth Year of George the Third, to the Twentieth Year, inclusive. Dublin: King's Printer. 1782. pp. 3–301 – via Google Books.
- "Acts of Parliament by Session: 1777". Irish Legislation Database. Queen's University Belfast.
- "Pre-Union Irish Statutes: 1777 Acts". Irish Statute Book. Attorney General of Ireland.

== 19 & 20 Geo. 3 (1779) ==
The 3rd session of the 3rd parliament of George III, which met from 12 October 1779 to 2 September 1780.

This session was also traditionally cited as 19 & 20 G. 3.

=== Public acts ===
Short title, or popular name	Citation	Royal assent
Long title
Additional Duties Act 1779 (repealed)	19 & 20 Geo. 3. c. 1 (I)	24 December 1779
An Act for granting unto his Majesty an additional duty on beer, ale, strong waters, wine, tobacco, hides, and other goods and merchandizes therein mentioned; and for prohibiting the importation of all gold and silver lace, and of all cambricks and lawns (except of the manufacture of Great Britain. (Repealed by Statute Law Revision (Ireland) Act 1879 (42 & 43 Vict. c. 24))
Loan Duties Act 1779 (repealed)	19 & 20 Geo. 3. c. 2 (I)	24 December 1779
An Act for granting unto his majesty the several duties, rates, impositions and taxes therein particularly expressed to be applied to the payment of the interest of the sums therein provided for, and towards the discharge of the said principal sums in such manner as therein is directed, and for such other purposes as are therein mentioned. (Repealed by Statute Law Revision (Ireland) Act 1879 (42 & 43 Vict. c. 24))
Stamp Duties Act 1779 (repealed)	19 & 20 Geo. 3. c. 3 (I)	24 May 1780
An Act for granting to his Majesty, his heirs and successors, several duties upon stamped vellum, parchment, and paper. (Repealed by Statute Law Revision (Ireland) Act 1879 (42 & 43 Vict. c. 24))
Trade Advancement Act 1779 (repealed)	19 & 20 Geo. 3. c. 4 (I)	24 December 1779
An Act for the advancement of the trade of this Kingdom. (Repealed by Statute Law Revision (Ireland) Act 1879 (42 & 43 Vict. c. 24))
Lottery Act 1779	19 & 20 Geo. 3. c. 5 (I)	24 December 1779
An Act for establishing a lottery, and for granting to his Majesty a sum of two hundred thousand pounds to be raised thereby, and for such other purposes as are therein mentioned.
Protestant Dissenters Relief Act 1779 (repealed)	19 & 20 Geo. 3. c. 6 (I)	2 May 1780
An Act for the relief of his majesty's faithful subjects the Protestant Dissenters of this kingdom, and to repeal a clause in the act of the 2nd of Queen Anne entitled "An Act to prevent the further growth of Popery." (Note: Popery Act 1703 (2 Anne c. 6 (I))) (Repealed by Statute Law Revision (Ireland) Act 1879 (42 & 43 Vict. c. 24))
Additional Duties (No. 2) Act 1779 (repealed)	19 & 20 Geo. 3. c. 7 (I)	24 May 1780
An Act for granting unto his majesty an additional duty on beer, ale, wine, tobacco, hides and other goods and merchandises therein mentioned, and for prohibiting the importation of all gold and silver lace, and of all cambrics and lawns, except of the manufacture of Great Britain, and of all hops, except of the growth of Great Britain and the British plantations. (Repealed by Statute Law Revision (Ireland) Act 1879 (42 & 43 Vict. c. 24))
Stamp Duties (No. 2) Act 1779 (repealed)	19 & 20 Geo. 3. c. 8 (I)	24 December 1779
An Act for granting to his Majesty, his heirs and successors, several duties upon stamped vellum, parchment, and paper. (Repealed by Statute Law Revision (Ireland) Act 1879 (42 & 43 Vict. c. 24))
Hawkers and Pedlars Act 1779 (repealed)	19 & 20 Geo. 3. c. 9 (I)	24 May 1780
An Act for licensing hawkers and pedlars, and for the encouragement of English protestant schools. (Repealed by Statute Law Revision (Ireland) Act 1879 (42 & 43 Vict. c. 24))
Loan Duties (No. 2) Act 1779 (repealed)	19 & 20 Geo. 3. c. 10 (I)	2 June 1780
An Act for granting unto his majesty the several duties, rates, impositions and taxes therein particularly expressed to be applied to the payment of the interest of the sums therein provided for, and towards the discharge of the said principal sums in such manner as therein is directed, and for such other purposes as are therein mentioned. (Repealed by Statute Law Revision (Ireland) Act 1879 (42 & 43 Vict. c. 24))
Trade Advancement (No. 2) Act 1779 (repealed)	19 & 20 Geo. 3. c. 11 (I)	19 August 1780
An Act for the advancement of trade, and for granting to his majesty, his heirs and successors the several duties therein mentioned. (Repealed by Statute Law Revision (Ireland) Act 1879 (42 & 43 Vict. c. 24))
Revenue Laws Act 1779 (repealed)	19 & 20 Geo. 3. c. 12 (I)	19 August 1780
An Act for continuing and amending several laws relating to his majesty's revenue, and for the more effectually preventing of frauds therein, and for such other purposes as are therein mentioned. (Repealed by Statute Law Revision (Ireland) Act 1879 (42 & 43 Vict. c. 24))
City of Dublin Act 1779	19 & 20 Geo. 3. c. 13 (I)	19 August 1780
An Act for explaining and amending an act passed in the fifteenth and sixteenth years of the reign of George the third, intitled, "An act for the better regulating the pipe-water of the city of Dublin." (Note: City of Dublin (No. 2) Act 1775 (15 & 16 Geo. 3. c. 24 (I)))
Temporary Statutes Act 1779 (repealed)	19 & 20 Geo. 3. c. 14 (I)	19 August 1780
An act for reviving, continuing, and amending several temporary statutes. (Repealed by Statute Law Revision (Ireland) Act 1879 (42 & 43 Vict. c. 24))
Dublin Streets and Poor Relief Act 1779	19 & 20 Geo. 3. c. 15 (I)	19 August 1780
An Act for continuing several temporary statutes, and for amending an act passed in the 11th and 12th years of the reign of his present majesty, (Note: City of Dublin Act 1771 (11 & 12 Geo. 3. c. 13 (I))) for the better paving, cleansing, lighting, altering and improving Sackville Street (Note: O'Connell Street, Dublin.) and Marlborough Street (Note: Marlborough Street, Dublin.) in the city of Dublin, and the lanes and avenues leading unto the same respectively, and for enabling the corporations for badging the poor within the county of Waterford and the county of the city of Waterford to unite and become one corporation, and also for establishing a body corporate within the town and parish of Lisburn in the county of Antrim, for the better support and government of the poor within the said town and parish.
Army Regulation Act 1779 (repealed)	19 & 20 Geo. 3. c. 16 (I)	19 August 1780
An Act for the better accommodation and regulation of his Majesty's army in this kingdom. (Repealed by Statute Law Revision (Ireland) Act 1879 (42 & 43 Vict. c. 24))
Corn Trade Act 1779 (repealed)	19 & 20 Geo. 3. c. 17 (I)	19 August 1780
An Act for the better regulating the corn trade of this kingdom. (Repealed by Statute Law Revision (Ireland) Act 1879 (42 & 43 Vict. c. 24))
Public Roads Act 1779	19 & 20 Geo. 3. c. 18 (I)	19 August 1780
An Act to empower grand juries to contract for keeping the publick roads in repair.
Obstruction of Trade Act 1779^{(Republic of Ireland)}	19 & 20 Geo. 3. c. 19 (I)	19 August 1780
An Act to prevent combinations, and for the further encouragement of trade.
Woollen Manufacture Act 1779	19 & 20 Geo. 3. c. 20 (I)	19 August 1780
An Act for the better regulation of the woollen manufacture of this kingdom.
Dublin Baking Trade Act 1779	19 & 20 Geo. 3. c. 21 (I)	19 August 1780
An Act to amend an act passed in the 17th and 18th years of the reign of his present majesty (Note: Dublin Baking Trade Act 1777 (17 & 18 Geo. 3. c. 17 (I))) entitled "An Act to continue and amend an act passed in the 13th and 14th years of his present majesty (Note: Dublin Baking Trade Act 1773 (13 & 14 Geo. 3. c. 47 (I))) entitled 'An Act for the better regulating the baking trade of the city of Dublin, and for other purposes.'"
Public Roads (Amendment) Act 1779 (repealed)	19 & 20 Geo. 3. c. 22 (I)	19 August 1780
An Act to amend a mistake in an act passed in the thirteenth and fourteenth years of his present Majesty, intitled, "An Act for amending the publick roads." (Note: Public Roads Act 1773 (13 & 14 Geo. 3. c. 32 (I))) (Repealed by Statute Law Revision (Ireland) Act 1879 (42 & 43 Vict. c. 24))
Tobacco Trade Act 1779 (repealed)	19 & 20 Geo. 3. c. 23 (I)	19 August 1780
An Act for regulating and extending the tobacco trade. (Repealed by Statute Law Revision (Ireland) Act 1879 (42 & 43 Vict. c. 24))
Silk Manufacture Act 1779 (repealed)	19 & 20 Geo. 3. c. 24 (I)	19 August 1780
An Act for the better regulation of the silk manufacture. (Repealed by Silk Manufactures Act 1824 (5 Geo. 4. c. 21))
Frauds by Bankrupts Act 1779	19 & 20 Geo. 3. c. 25 (I)	19 August 1780
An Act to explain an act, intitled, "An Act to prevent frauds committed by bankrupts." (Note: Frauds by Bankrupts Act 1771 (11 & 12 Geo. 3. c. 8 (I)))
Small Debts (Dublin) Act 1779 (repealed)	19 & 20 Geo. 3. c. 26 (I)	19 August 1780
An Act for amending the acts of the 2nd (Note: Bogs Draining and Inland Carriage Act 1715 (2 Geo. 1. c. 11 (I))) and 8th (Note: Quieting Possessions and Preventing Vexatious Suits Act 1721 (8 Geo. 1. c. 4 (I))) years of the reign of his late majesty King George I, and in the 1st year of his late majesty King George II, (Note: Small Debts Recovery Act 1727 (1 Geo. 2. c. 14 (I))) for recovery of small debts in a summary way by civil bill, as far as they relate to the county of Dublin. (Repealed by Civil Bill Courts (Ireland) Act 1851 (14 & 15 Vict. c. 57))
City of Cork Punishment Act 1779	19 & 20 Geo. 3. c. 27 (I)	19 August 1780
An Act to prevent the infliction of the punishment of whipping under an act passed in the 11th and 12th years of his present majesty entitled "An Act for the regulating of the city of Cork, and for other purposes therein mentioned relative to the said city" (Note: City of Cork Act 1771 (11 & 12 Geo. 3. c. 18 (I))) without first having the person on whom such punishment shall be inflicted convicted by a jury.
Qualification Indemnity Act 1779 (repealed)	19 & 20 Geo. 3. c. 28 (I)	19 August 1780
An Act for the relief of persons who have omitted to qualify themselves according to law. (Repealed by Statute Law Revision (Ireland) Act 1879 (42 & 43 Vict. c. 24))
Naturalization Act 1779 (repealed)	19 & 20 Geo. 3. c. 29 (I)	19 August 1780
An Act for naturalizing such foreign merchants, traders, artificers, artizans, manufacturers, workmen, seamen, farmers, and others, as shall settle in this kingdom. (Repealed by Naturalization Act 1870 (33 & 34 Vict. c. 14))
Tenantry Act 1779^{(Republic of Ireland)}	19 & 20 Geo. 3. c. 30 (I)	2 September 1780
An Act for the Relief of Tenants holding under Leases for Lives containing Covenants for perpetual Renewals.
Lottery Offices Act 1779	19 & 20 Geo. 3. c. 31 (I)	19 August 1780
An Act for licensing and regulating lottery offices, and for other purposes therein mentioned.
Lagan Navigation Act 1779	19 & 20 Geo. 3. c. 32 (I)	19 August 1780
An Act for amending and explaining the several laws made in this kingdom for carrying on the Lagan navigation.
Linen and Hempen Bounties Act 1779 (repealed)	19 & 20 Geo. 3. c. 33 (I)	2 September 1780
An Act for granting bounties on the export of certain species of the linen and hempen manufactures of this kingdom therein enumerated, and for repealing the bounties on flax seed imported, and for encouraging the growth thereof in this kingdom. (Repealed by Statute Law Revision (Ireland) Act 1879 (42 & 43 Vict. c. 24))
Tillage Act 1779 (repealed)	19 & 20 Geo. 3. c. 34 (I)	2 September 1780
An Act for continuing an act passed in the 17th and 18th years of his present majesty entitled "An Act for the encouragement of tillage, and rendering the carriage of corn to the city of Dublin less expensive." (Note: Tillage Act 1777 (17 & 18 Geo. 3. c. 31 (I))) (Repealed by Statute Law Revision (Ireland) Act 1879 (42 & 43 Vict. c. 24))
Sugar Trade Act 1779 (repealed)	19 & 20 Geo. 3. c. 35 (I)	2 September 1780
An Act for regulating the sugar trade, and granting to his Majesty, his heirs and successors, the duties therein mentioned. (Repealed by Statute Law Revision (Ireland) Act 1879 (42 & 43 Vict. c. 24))
Provisions and Butter Trade Act 1779 (repealed)	19 & 20 Geo. 3. c. 36 (I)	19 August 1780
An Act for regulating the curing and preparing provisions and for preventing combinations among the several tradesmen and other persons employed in making up such provisions, and for regulating the butter trade in the city of Dublin, and for other purposes therein mentioned. (Repealed by Statute Law Revision (Ireland) Act 1879 (42 & 43 Vict. c. 24))
Malicious Damage (Houghing Cattle) Act 1779 (repealed)	19 & 20 Geo. 3. c. 37 (I)	19 August 1780
An Act to prevent the detestable practices of houghing cattle, burning of houses, barns, haggards, and corn, and for other purposes. (Repealed by Statute Law Revision (Ireland) Act 1879 (42 & 43 Vict. c. 24))
Frivolous Arrests Act 1779 (repealed)	19 & 20 Geo. 3. c. 38 (I)	19 August 1780
An Act to prevent vexatious and frivolous arrests, and for other purposes. (Repealed for the Republic of Ireland by Statute Law Revision (Pre-Union Irish Statutes) Act 1962 (No. 29) and for Northern Ireland by Statute Law Revision Act 1950 (14 Geo. 6. c. 6))
Popish Priests Conversion Act 1779 (repealed)	19 & 20 Geo. 3. c. 39 (I)	2 September 1780
An Act for explaining an act made in the 8th year of the reign of her late majesty Queen Anne entitled "An Act for explaining and amending an act (Note: Popery Act 1703 (2 Anne c. 6 (I))) to prevent the further growth of Popery," (Note: Popery Act 1709 (8 Anne c. 3 (I))) so far only as the same makes a provision for the maintenance of Popish priests converted to the Protestant religion. (Repealed by Statute Law Revision (Ireland) Act 1879 (42 & 43 Vict. c. 24))
Insolvent Debtors (No. 2) Act 1779 (repealed)	19 & 20 Geo. 3. c. 40 (I)	2 September 1780
An Act for the relief of persons in actual custody for debt. (Repealed by Statute Law Revision (Ireland) Act 1879 (42 & 43 Vict. c. 24))
Bridges Act 1779 (repealed)	19 & 20 Geo. 3. c. 41 (I)	19 August 1780
An Act for empowering grand juries to present bridges and tolls to be paid for passing the same in certain cases. (Repealed by Statute Law Revision (Ireland) Act 1879 (42 & 43 Vict. c. 24))
Cork Baking Trade Act 1779	19 & 20 Geo. 3. c. 42 (I)	19 August 1780
An Act for regulating the baking trade in the city of Cork.
Dublin to Navan, Nobber, and Kells Road Act 1779	19 & 20 Geo. 3. c. 43 (I)	19 August 1780
An Act for continuing, altering, amending and making more effectual an act of parliament passed in the 17th and 18th years of the reign of his present majesty (Note: Dublin to Navan, Nobber, and Kells Road Act 1777 (17 & 18 Geo. 3. c. 37 (I))) entitled "An Act for continuing and amending an act passed in the 15th and 16th years of the reign of his present majesty (Note: Dublin to Navan, Nobber, and Kells Road Act 1776 (15 & 16 Geo. 3. c. 37 (I))) entitled 'An Act for continuing an act passed in the 7th year of his late majesty King George II (Note: Dublin to Navan, Nobber, and Kells Road Act 1733 (7 Geo. 2. c. 22 (I))) entitled "An Act for repairing the roads leading from the city of Dublin (Note: Dublin.) to the town of Navan (Note: Navan, County Meath.) in the county of Meath, and for repairing the roads leading from the said town of Navan to the town of Nobber (Note: Nobber, County Meath.) in the said county, as also for repairing the road leading from the said town of Navan to the town of Kells (Note: Kells, County Meath.) in the said county.
Dublin Roads (Amendment) Act 1779	19 & 20 Geo. 3. c. 44 (I)	19 August 1780
An Act to amend an act, intitled, "An Act for making and amending publick roads in the county of Dublin, and for regulating, applotting, and levying of money in the county of the city of Dublin." (Note: Dublin Roads and Levies Act 1773 (13 & 14 Geo. 3. c. 34 (I)))
Callan to Clonmel Road Act 1779	19 & 20 Geo. 3. c. 45 (I)	19 August 1780
An Act for making, repairing and shortening a road from the cross of Callan (Note: Callan, County Kilkenny.) in the county of Kilkenny, through the town of Mullinahone (Note: Mullinahone, County Tipperary.) and by the ford of Kilmore, called Black Ford, and Poorstown, to the town of Clonmel (Note: Clonmel, County Tipperary.) in the county of Tipperary.
Nenagh to O'Brien's Bridge Road Act 1779	19 & 20 Geo. 3. c. 46 (I)	19 August 1780
An Act for making and keeping in repair a road to lead from the town of Nenagh (Note: Nenagh, County Tipperary.) in the county of Tipperary to O'Brien's bridge (Note: O'Brien's Bridge, County Clare.) in the county of Clare.
Nenagh to Curranaboy Bridge Road Act 1779	19 & 20 Geo. 3. c. 47 (I)	19 August 1780
An Act for amending and making more effectual an act (Note: Nenagh to Curranaboy Bridge Road Act 1777 (17 & 18 Geo. 3. c. 39 (I))) for repairing the road leading from the town of Nenagh in the county of Tipperary, through the towns of Birr (Note: Birr, County Offaly.) and Ferbane (Note: Ferbane, County Offaly.) in the King's County, to Curranaboy Bridge on the turnpike road leading to Athlone (Note: Athlone, County Westmeath.) in the county of Westmeath, and for other purposes therein mentioned.
Clonmel to Doneraile Road Act 1779	19 & 20 Geo. 3. c. 48 (I)	19 August 1780
An Act for amending an act made in the thirteenth year of his late majesty George II entitled "An Act for repairing and amending the road leading from the town of Clonmel (Note: Clonmel, County Tipperary.) in the County Tipperary, through the towns of Clogheen, (Note: Clogheen, County Cork.) Mitchelstown, (Note: Mitchelstown, County Cork.) and to Doneraile (Note: Doneraile, County Cork.) in the county of Cork," (Note: Clonmel to Doneraile Road Act 1739 (13 Geo. 2. c. 15 (I))) and a further act passed in the twenty ninth year of his said majesty's reign entitled "An Act for amending and repairing the said roads, and for other purposes." (Note: Clonmel to Doneraile Road Act 1755 (29 Geo. 2. c. 20 (I)))
Cork to Kilworth Road Act 1779	19 & 20 Geo. 3. c. 49 (I)	19 August 1780
An Act for altering, amending, continuing and making more effectual an act made in the 13th and 14th years of the reign of his present majesty entitled "An Act for amending and repairing the road leading from the city of Cork (Note: Cork, County Cork.) to the brook which bounds the counties of Cork and Tipperary near the foot of Kilworth Mountain," (Note: Cork to Kilworth Road Act 1773 (13 & 14 Geo. 3. c. 29 (I))) and on to Knockboy turnpike gate.
Turnpike Roads (No. 2) Act 1779 (repealed)	19 & 20 Geo. 3. c. 50 (I)	19 August 1780
An Act for further enforcing a due execution of the laws relative to turnpike roads in this kingdom. (Repealed by Statute Law Revision (Ireland) Act 1879 (42 & 43 Vict. c. 24))
Cavendish's Estate Act 1779	19 & 20 Geo. 3. c. 51 (I)	2 September 1780
An Act for vesting a competent part of the real and personal estates of the late right honourable sir Henry Cavendish baronet deceased in trustees for discharging a debt due by the said sir Henry Cavendish to his Majesty, and for the purposes therein mentioned.

=== Private acts ===
Short title, or popular name	Citation	Royal assent
Long title
Earl of Inchiquin's Estate Act 1779	19 & 20 Geo. 3. c. 1 Pr. (I)	19 August 1780
An Act for vesting certain lands and premises therein mentioned, part of the estate of the Right Honourable Murrough, earl of Inchiquin, in trustees, for raising a sum not exceeding £30,000 by sale or mortgage of a competent part of the said estates, to be applied for the protection, enlargement and improvement of the said estates, and for quieting and compounding claims relative thereto.
Simpson's Hospital Estate Act 1779^{(Republic of Ireland)}^{(United Kingdom)}	19 & 20 Geo. 3. c. 2 Pr. (I)	19 August 1780
An Act for incorporating the Trustees of George Simpson Esquire's Hospital.
Mathew's Estate Act 1779	19 & 20 Geo. 3. c. 3 Pr. (I)	19 August 1780
An Act for vesting in trustees certain lands, tenements and hereditaments in the kingdom of Ireland, the estate of Francis Mathew of Thomastown in the county of Tipperary, esquire, for raising a sufficient sum of money for the payment of debts affecting the same, and for enlarging the jointure of Ellis, his wife, and the portions of his younger children by her.
Sherlock's Estate Act 1779	19 & 20 Geo. 3. c. 4 Pr. (I)	19 August 1780
An Act to enable William Sherlock, esquire, to make leases, and to charge portions for his younger children, and for other purposes.
Bever's Estate Act 1779	19 & 20 Geo. 3. c. 5 Pr. (I)	19 August 1780
An Act to enable Edward Bever of Feltrim in the county of Dublin, esquire, to make leases of certain towns, lands and premises, part of his estate, situate in the county of Dublin, and for other purposes therein mentioned.

=== Sources ===
- "The nineteenth and twentieth years of George III". The Statutes at Large, Passed in the Parliaments held in Ireland. Vol. XI: Statutes that have passed from the Seventeenth Year of George the Third, to the Twentieth Year, inclusive. Dublin: King's Printer. 1782. pp. 303–777 – via Google Books.
- "Acts of Parliament by Session: 1779". Irish Legislation Database. Queen's University Belfast.
- "Pre-Union Irish Statutes: 1779 Acts". Irish Statute Book. Attorney General of Ireland.
