= Lagan Canal =

Canal between Belfast and Lough Neagh, Northern Ireland

Coordinates: 54°36′N 5°54′W

Lagan Navigation
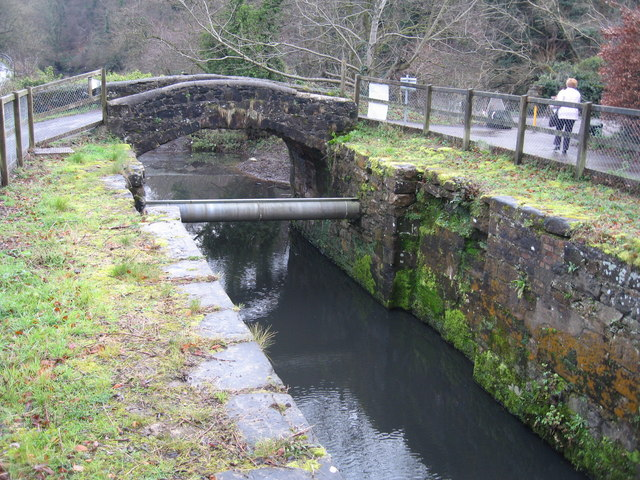
- McLeave's Lock, which retains its original footbridge and lock keeper's cottage
- Interactive map of Lagan Navigation

Specifications
- Length: 44 km (27 miles)
- Locks: 27
- Status: part extant, part destroyed

History
- Original owner: Lagan Navigation Co
- Principal engineer: Thomas Omer
- Date of act: 1753
- Date of first use: 1763
- Date closed: 1958

Geography
- Start point: Belfast
- End point: Lough Neagh

The Lagan Canal was a 44-kilometre (27 mi) canal built to connect Belfast to Lough Neagh. The first section, which is a river navigation, was opened in 1763, and linked Belfast to Lisburn. The second section from Lisburn to Lough Neagh includes a small amount of river navigation, but was largely built as a canal. At its peak it was one of the most successful of the Irish canals, but ultimately it was unable to compete with road and rail transport, and the two sections were closed in 1954 and 1958. The central section from Sprucefield to Moira was destroyed by the construction of the M1 motorway in the 1960s. Responsibility for most of its remains passed first to the Department of Agriculture and then to the Department of Culture, Arts and Leisure, although the section between Aghalee Bridge and Lough Neagh, including the final ten locks, passed into private ownership. There is an active campaign to re-open the canal, including reinstatement of the central section.

== History ==
Lagan Navigation Act 1753
- Act of Parliament
- Parliament of Ireland
- Long title: An Act for making the river Lagan navigable, and opening passage by water between Lough-Neagh and the town of Belfast in the county of Antrim.
- Citation: 27 Geo. 2. c. 3 (I)

Dates
- Royal assent: 22 December 1753

Lagan Navigation Act 1763
- Act of Parliament
- Parliament of Ireland
- Long title: An Act for continuing and amending an act entitled "An Act for making the River Lagan navigable, and opening a passage by water from Lough Neagh to the town of Belfast in the county of Antrim."
- Citation: 3 Geo. 3. c. 6 (I)

Dates
- Royal assent: 12 May 1764

The River Lagan at Moira is only 10 kilometres (6.2 mi) from Lough Neagh, the largest inland lake in Britain and Ireland, and the terrain between the two is relatively flat. In 1637, the first suggestions that a navigable link could be constructed were made, but no action was taken at the time. Following the discovery of coal deposits in east Tyrone, which resulted in the construction of the Newry Canal, there was renewed interest, and in 1741 Arthur Dobbs, the Surveyor General, surveyed the route. Another twelve years elapsed before a petition was presented to the Irish House of Commons, which resulted in an act of Parliament, the Lagan Navigation Act 1753 (27 Geo. 2. c. 3 (I)), being passed on 24 October 1753 to authorise the work. The engineer Acheson Johnston estimated that making the River Lagan navigable to Moira and then building a navigable cut to Lough Neagh would cost £20,000. Since 1729, all such work was managed by the Commissioners of Inland Navigation for Ireland, but the funds at their disposal were limited. The canal was therefore funded by imposing an extra tax on alcohol sold in the districts through which the canal would pass, which amounted to one penny per gallon on ale and fourpence on spirits. The tax would last for eleven years from 1753, and on this basis, work began in 1756.

The engineer overseeing the project was Thomas Omer, and some 6 miles (9.7 km) of river had been made navigable within the first year. The work included new cuts to remove meandering sections of the river, four locks, the removal of shoals, and the construction of a towpath. The Irish Parliament gave additional grants of £4,000 towards the project in 1759 and 1761, and the navigation was completed as far as Lisburn in 1763. A formal opening took place in September, when the Lord Hertford, a 60-ton lighter, loaded with 45 tons of coal and timber, made the journey from Belfast to Lisburn. A small additional section to Sprucefield had been completed by 1765, but work then stopped. Around £40,000 had been spent on the project, but it was evident that using the river was not ideal, as it was subject to flooding in winter, and there was a linen bleaching industry along its course, who objected to the navigation commissioners having control of the flow of the river.

Lagan Navigation Act 1771
- Act of Parliament
- Parliament of Ireland
- Long title: An Act for continuing two several acts, one passed in the 27th year of his late majesty King George II, and the other in the 3rd year of his present majesty's reign, for making the River Lagan navigable, and opening a communication by water between Lough Neagh and the town of Belfast, and for enabling the commissioners therein named to raise money by assignment of said duties, for the more effectual carrying on said work.
- Citation: 11 & 12 Geo. 3. c. 26 (I)

Dates
- Royal assent: 2 June 1772

Lagan Navigation Act 1773
- Act of Parliament
- Parliament of Ireland
- Long title: An Act for continuing and amending three several acts, one passed in the reign of his late majesty King George II, and the other two in his present majesty's reign, for making the River Lagan navigable, and opening a communication by water between Lough Neagh and the town of Belfast, and for enabling the commissioners therein named to raise money by assignment of said duties, for the more expeditious and effectual carrying on of said work.
- Citation: 13 & 14 Geo. 3. c. 12 (I)

Dates
- Royal assent: 4 May 1774

Lagan Navigation Act 1779
- Act of Parliament
- Parliament of Ireland
- Long title: An Act for amending and explaining the several laws made in this kingdom for carrying on the Lagan navigation.
- Citation: 19 & 20 Geo. 3. c. 32 (I)

Dates
- Royal assent: 19 August 1780

In 1768, the engineer Robert Whitworth, who by this time was James Brindley's chief surveyor and draughtsman, was asked to assess the project. He reported that the river section was not suitable for navigation, and should be replaced by a canal, for which he suggested two routes and a cost of £22,000, and that beyond Sprucefield the navigation should be constructed as a canal, either on the north bank of the Lagan, or on the south, which would involve building an aqueduct at Spencer's Bridge to cross the river. Although attempts were made to raise the necessary finance, and two acts of Parliament were obtained, the Lagan Navigation Act 1771 (11 & 12 Geo. 3. c. 26 (I)), and the Lagan Navigation Act 1773 (13 & 14 Geo. 3. c. 12 (I)), to give additional powers to local commissioners, no real progress was made, and in 1779, the 'Company of Undertakers of the Lagan Navigation' was formed. The Marquess of Donegall was the chief shareholder, and most other members were either landed gentry or drawn from the nobility, and so had considerable financial resources.

In June 1782, Richard Owen, who had worked on the construction of the Leeds and Liverpool Canal for ten years agreed to oversee the project for four years. The company had insufficient capital to build a new canal below Lisburn, nor to fund the northern route to Lough Neagh, and so construction started on the southern route. The four Union Locks raised boats from the river to a summit level, which followed a course due west, and then turned to the north west to cross the Lagan. The aqueduct cost £3,000 and took nearly three years to build. Progress was much slower than expected, but Aghalee was reached in March 1792, ten years after Owen began work. Initially, goods were transferred between the canal and the shore of the lough by road, for the final connection was not completed until December 1793. The Marquess of Donegall opened the canal on 1 January 1794, by travelling from Owen's house at Moira to Lough Neagh by boat. He had funded most of the £62,000 cost himself. The summit level was 11 miles (18 km) long, with a flight of 10 locks, each 70 by 16 feet (21.3 by 4.9 m) at Aghalee, and four at Sprucefield.

=== Operation ===
The canal was not as successful as expected. There were problems with water supply on the summit level, because water from the Lagan was needed by the bleaching industry further down the river, and so could not be used indiscriminately. Below Lisburn, there were often problems where excess water during periods of high rainfall washed away the new banks. The Union Locks were not completed, and work continued until 1796, while it was suggested that Owen had prolonged the work for his own benefit. John Dubourdieu, writing in 1802, concluded that the use of the river was a fatal flaw, and that the navigation would have been much better if the lower section had been built as a canal to the same standard as the upper section. The canal had been planned to enable coal from the east Tyrone coalfields to reach Belfast, but in practice, higher quality coal was imported through Belfast and distributed to the communities around the canal and Lough Neagh.

Lagan Navigation Act 1814
- Act of Parliament
- Parliament of the United Kingdom
- Long title: An Act for amending and continuing several Acts made for the Improvement of the Lagan Navigation, and for further extending the same.
- Citation: 54 Geo. 3. c. ccxxxi

Dates
- Royal assent: 29 July 1814

A group of businessmen from Belfast took over the canal in 1810. They investigated costs for a new canal section from Belfast to Union Locks. Owen estimated that it would cost £42,425, and an application was made for half of this amount to the Directors General of Inland Navigation. They sent John Killaly to report on the plans, who suggested a new canal section from the Blackstaff river to the second lock, to avoid the tidal section near to Belfast. Owen's and Killaly's ideas formed the basis for the Lagan Navigation Act 1814 (54 Geo. 3. c. ccxxxi), but the proposals to split the navigation channel from the river and to build a reservoir at Broadwater near Aghalee to supply the summit level were never implemented. However, improvements were made, towpaths were created, and traffic increased, although there were still some water supply problems. The canal did not make a profit, and when the Exchequer Bill Loan Commissioners refused to make a loan to fund the work, the likelihood of a new canal at the lower end receded.

Lagan Navigation Act 1843
- Act of Parliament
- Parliament of the United Kingdom
- Long title: An Act to incorporate the Persons having Claims upon the Lagan Navigation in Ireland, and to provide for the future Management and Improvement of the said Navigation.
- Citation: 6 & 7 Vict. c. civ

Dates
- Royal assent: 22 August 1843

Text of statute as originally enacted

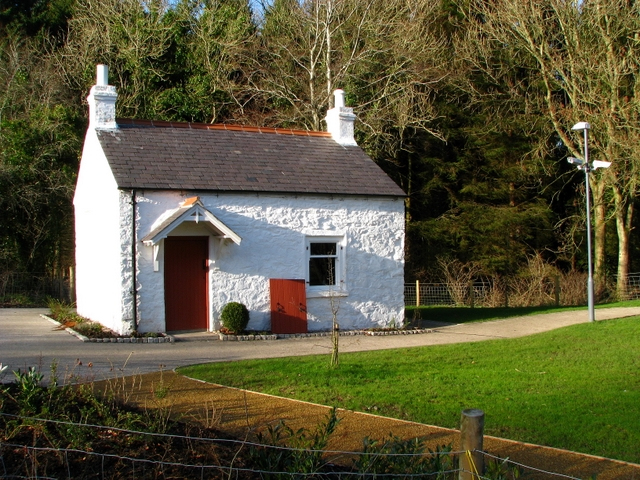
Kilpatrick Families lock-keeper's cottage near Shaw's Bridge, built 1827–34

In the 1820s and 1830s, there was competition on short-haul traffic from the road network, but it was hoped that the construction of the Ulster Canal, linking Lough Neagh to Lough Erne and the River Shannon, would create long-haul traffic. The Directors General of Inland Waterways were replaced by the Board of Public Works, and although they took control of the Tyrone Navigation in 1831 and the Ulster Canal in 1851, there was local opposition to them taking over the Lagan Canal. The old company was replaced by the Lagan Navigation Company by the Lagan Navigation Act 1843 (6 & 7 Vict. c. civ), to ensure that the canal was maintained in good order, but the Board of Public Works supervised its activities quite closely. They successfully competed with the Ulster Railway, which had reached Portadown in 1842, and ploughed all profits back into improvements until 1859, when they announced a first dividend of one per cent. The canal was one of only two inland waterways in the north of Ireland that was commercially successful. Dividends gradually increased, and by the 1870s, traffic figures were more than double those of the 1830s.

The condition of the Ulster Canal worried the Lagan Navigation Company, as almost no trade passed between the two. This was not helped by the fact that the locks on the Ulster Canal were narrower, and the depth over the cills was less, so that Lagan boats could not work the canal, and goods had to be transshipped. Although the Board of Public Works controlled the Ulster Canal, and had spent £20,000 on it since they took control in 1865, no additional traffic had been generated. Between 1878 and 1880, the Lagan Canal built five boats which could work through both canals. The Lagan Canal was persuaded to take over the Ulster Canal and the Coalisland Canal or Tyrone Navigation in 1888. Although they spent a great deal on improvements, the additional canals remained in a poor state and continued to make a loss. The Lagan itself was maintained well, and traffic rose from 153,000 tons in 1893 to 170,000 tons in 1898.

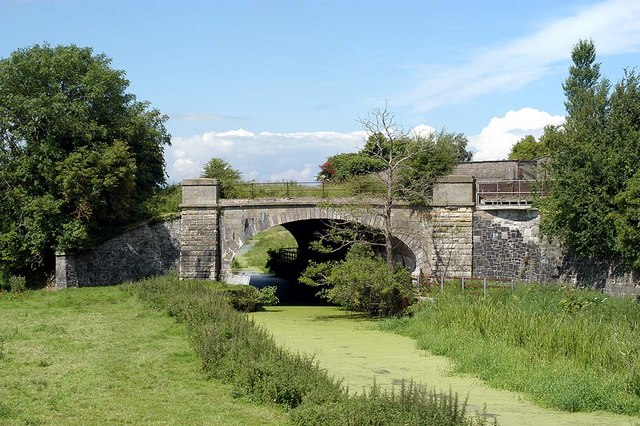
Crossing of the Lagan Canal by the Ulster Railway near Moira.

=== Decline ===
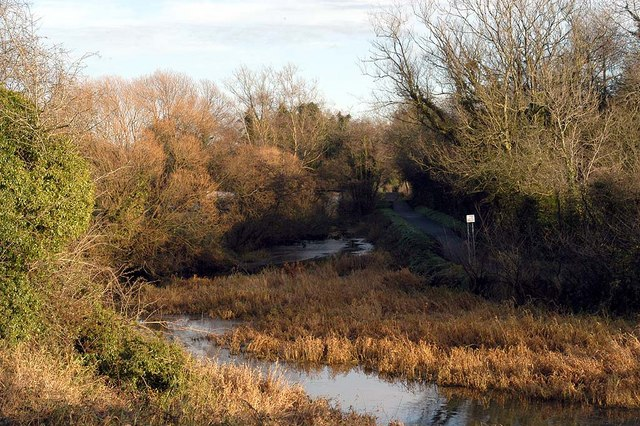
An overgrown section of the Lagan Canal near Dunmurry

During the First World War, traffic dropped by half, but after hostilities ended, the government returned the canal to private ownership, some £20,000 was spent on repairs, and traffic flourished. In the 1920s, traffic from Belfast to Lisburn averaged 307,033 tons of coal and 19,126 tons of other goods. Traffic above Lisburn was much lower, but some coal continued to reach the Ulster Canal until it was closed in 1931. There were large cargoes of sand and gravel travelling in the opposite direction, originating on the east Tyrone shores of Lough Neagh, and used for building projects in Belfast. The years immediately before the Second World War saw a collapse in commercial canal traffic. Downstream traffic dropped from 29,000 tons to 600 tons between 1931 and 1941, while upstream traffic dropped from 87,000 tons to 28,000 tons. The canals were thought to be too slow, compared to roads and railways.

With their funds exhausted, the company considered closure of their canal and the Coalisland Canal. However, there was a clause in the Lagan Navigation Act 1843 which stated that if the canals became unnavigable, the Lagan Navigation Company would automatically cease to exist. Rather than create an awkward political situation, where the Ministry of Commerce inherited canals that were already defunct, the government made payments to the company to cover operating losses and some repairs to the infrastructure. Between 1938 and 1952, these payments amounted to £130,000. There had been no traffic above Lisburn since 1947, and the Ministry of Commerce announced that the canals would close in the spring of 1954. The Inland Navigation Act (Northern Ireland) 1954 was passed in April 1954, and the Coalisland Canal, the Upper Bann Navigation and the Lagan Canal above Lisburn were closed. Below Lisburn, the canal remained open for another four years, but was closed on 1 July 1958. In 1965, some 7.7 miles (12.4 km) of the central section, between Moira and Sprucefield, were destroyed by the building of the M1 motorway along its route.

== Restoration ==
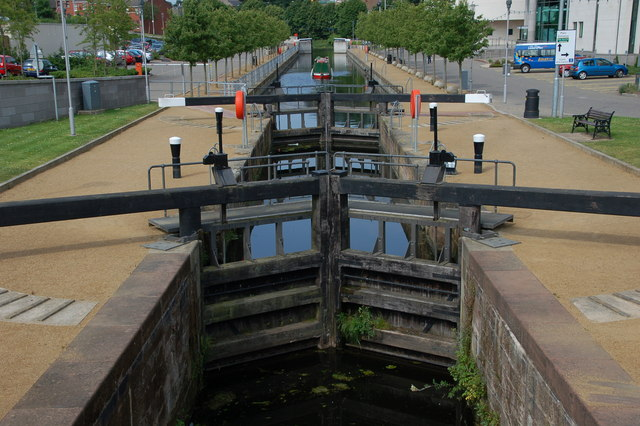
The restored Lock 12 at Lisburn

There are proposals to restore the canal, to once again provide a navigable link between Belfast and Lough Neagh. Initially, a steering group was formed, with representatives from local councils, user groups and central government. The Lagan Canal Restoration Trust was a logical development of this group, and was formed as a company limited by guarantee in 2008 with representatives from the three councils which administer the areas through which the canal runs, and six other key partners, including the Northern Ireland Environment Agency, the Department for Culture, Arts and Leisure, and the Inland Waterways Association of Ireland. There are also representatives from other groups with an interest in the area. In 2016, the Trust was renamed to become the Lagan Navigation Trust.

As part of the assessment process, a feasibility study was carried out by Fergus and McIlveen of Belfast. It concluded that even though parts of the route have been destroyed by the building of the M1 motorway, there were no insurmountable barriers to restoring the canal, which "has the potential to become one of the most significant recreational waterways in these islands." A small section of the canal near Lisburn Civic Centre, which includes lock 12, has been restored to navigable condition, and there are three major sections of towpath which can now be accessed by the public. All of the locks and many of the other structures associated with the canal are scheduled monuments, which gives them some protection.

A proposal for a £2.5 million scheme to build a new lock, weir and footbridge at Stranmillis Gateway, at the site of the original first lock, was first suggested in 2005, and an economic appraisal of the scheme was undertaken. The scope was increased, to include restoration of the first 10 kilometres (6.2 mi) of the navigation, as far as Edenberrry, but despite the Ulster Garden Villages Trust offering £1 million to kick-start the project, little progress was made. The project was to include restoration of the second lock at Corby Wood. Lock 3 at Newforge has been restored, together with the lock keeper's cottage, with funding provided by the Heritage Fund, the Lottery Partnership Scheme and the Department for Culture, Arts and Leisure. An 1.5-kilometre (0.9 mi) stretch of the towpath has been reopened at Aghagallon, following work by Craigavon Borough Council to obtain access rights. Since the closure of the canal, the section between Aghalee and Lough Neagh has been privately owned, and this is the first part of that section where public access has been restored.

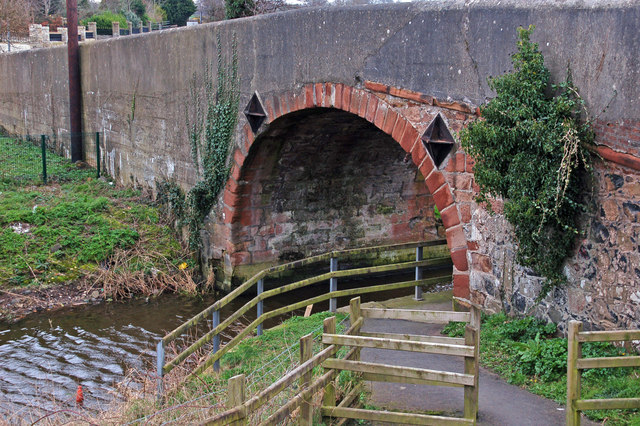
Albert Bridge, carrying Station Road at Moira

The project to build a new lock at Stranmillis and to restore lock 2 was restarted in late 2017. The site of the lock is occupied by a pen weir, which maintains the river levels between Stranmillis and Newforge, but it is inefficient, causes erosion of the river bed, and prevents navigation. The cost has risen to £4 million, which has been provided by Belfast City Council, Ulster Garden Villages, and the Department for Intrastructure. Lock 2 is at Mooreland Meadow, which is in the Lagan Valley Regional Park.

== See also ==
- Canals of Ireland
- Canals of the United Kingdom
- History of the British canal system

== Bibliography ==
- Bath, Ian (May 2009). "The Lagan Navigation". Waterways World. ISSN 0309-1422.
- LCT (2010). "Guide to the Lagan Canal" (PDF). Lagan Canal Trust. Archived from the original (PDF) on 26 April 2012.
- McCutcheon, W A (1965). The Canals of the North of Ireland. David and Charles. ISBN 978-0-7153-4028-8.
- "Navigation reopening in Northern Ireland". Waterways World. January 2018. ISSN 0309-1422.
- Skempton, Sir Alec; et al. (2002). A Biographical Dictionary of Civil Engineers in Great Britain and Ireland: Vol 1: 1500 to 1830. Thomas Telford. ISBN 978-0-7277-2939-2.
