= List of acts of the Parliament of Ireland, 1781–1790 =

This is a list of acts of the Parliament of Ireland for the years from 1781 to 1790.

The number shown by each act's title is its chapter number. Acts are cited using this number, preceded by the years of the reign during which the relevant parliamentary session was held; thus the act concerning assay passed in 1783 is cited as "23 & 24 Geo. 3. c. 23", meaning the 23rd act passed during the session that started in the 23rd year of the reign of George III and which finished in the 24th year of that reign. The modern convention is to use Arabic numerals in citations (thus "40 Geo. 3" rather than "40 Geo. III"). Acts of the reign of Elizabeth I are formally cited without a regnal numeral in the Republic of Ireland.

Acts passed by the Parliament of Ireland did not have a short title; however, some of these acts have subsequently been given a short title by acts of the Parliament of the United Kingdom, acts of the Parliament of Northern Ireland, or acts of the Oireachtas. This means that some acts have different short titles in the Republic of Ireland and Northern Ireland respectively. Official short titles are indicated by the flags of the respective jurisdictions.

A number of the acts included in this list are still in force in Northern Ireland or the Republic of Ireland. Because these two jurisdictions are entirely separate, the version of an act in force in one may differ from the version in force in the other; similarly, an act may have been repealed in one but not in the other.

A number of acts passed by the Parliament of Great Britain also extended to Ireland during this period.

== 21 & 22 Geo. 3 (1781) ==
The 4th session of the 3rd parliament of George III, which met from 9 October 1781 to 27 July 1782.

This session was also traditionally cited as 21 & 22 G. 3.

=== Public acts ===
Short title, or popular name	Citation	Royal assent
Long title
Revenue Act 1781 (repealed)	21 & 22 Geo. 3. c. 1 (I)	22 December 1781
An Act for Granting to His Majesty an additional Duty on Beer, Ale, Wine, Hides, and other Goods and Merchandizes therein mentioned; and for prohibiting the Importation of all Gold and Silver Lace, and of all Cambricks and Lawns, except of the Manufacture of Great Britain; and of all Hops, except of the Growth of Great Britain, and the British Plantations; and of all Glass, except from Great Britain. (Repealed by Statute Law Revision (Ireland) Act 1879 (42 & 43 Vict. c. 24))
Revenue and Supply Act 1781 (repealed)	21 & 22 Geo. 3. c. 2 (I)	22 December 1781
An Act for granting unto His Majesty the several Aids, Duties, Impositions, and Taxes therein particularly expressed, to be applied to the Payment of the Interest of the Sums therein provided for, and towards the Discharge of the said principal Sums, in such Manner as therein is directed; and for such other Purposes as are therein mentioned. (Repealed by Statute Law Revision (Ireland) Act 1879 (42 & 43 Vict. c. 24))
Stamp Duties Act 1781 (repealed)	21 & 22 Geo. 3. c. 3 (I)	22 December 1781
An Act for granting to His Majesty, His Heirs and Successors, several Duties upon stamped Vellum, Parchment, and Paper. (Repealed by Statute Law Revision (Ireland) Act 1879 (42 & 43 Vict. c. 24))
Tobacco Trade Act 1781 (repealed)	21 & 22 Geo. 3. c. 4 (I)	26 December 1781
An Act for regulating and extending the Tobacco Trade, and for granting to His Majesty, His Heirs and Successors, the Duties therein mentioned. (Repealed by Statute Law Revision (Ireland) Act 1879 (42 & 43 Vict. c. 24))
Trade and Duties Act 1781 (repealed)	21 & 22 Geo. 3. c. 5 (I)	26 December 1781
An Act for the Advancement of Trade, and for granting to His Majesty, His Heirs and Successors, the several Duties therein mentioned. (Repealed by Statute Law Revision (Ireland) Act 1879 (42 & 43 Vict. c. 24))
Sugar Trade Act 1781 (repealed)	21 & 22 Geo. 3. c. 6 (I)	26 December 1781
An Act for regulating the Sugar Trade, and for granting to His Majesty, His Heirs and Successors, the Duties therein mentioned. (Repealed by Statute Law Revision (Ireland) Act 1879 (42 & 43 Vict. c. 24))
Popery Act 1781 or the Offices Qualification Act 1781 (repealed)	21 & 22 Geo. 3. c. 7 (I)	26 December 1781
An Act for allowing further Time to Persons in Offices or Employments to qualify themselves pursuant to an Act, entitled, "An Act to prevent the further Growth of Popery." (Note: Popery Act 1703 (2 Anne c. 6 (I))) (Repealed by Statute Law Revision (Ireland) Act 1879 (42 & 43 Vict. c. 24))
Linen and Hempen Manufacture Act 1781 (repealed)	21 & 22 Geo. 3. c. 8 (I)	12 February 1782
An Act to promote the Linen and Hempen Manufacture, by encreasing the Supply of Irish Flax-Seed, and encouraging the Export of Linens and Sail-Cloth, and for other Purposes. (Repealed by Statute Law Revision (Ireland) Act 1879 (42 & 43 Vict. c. 24))
Drawbacks and Bounties Act 1781 (repealed)	21 & 22 Geo. 3. c. 9 (I)	12 February 1782
An Act for regulating Drawbacks and Bounties, preventing Export of Manufacturing Utensils, except to Great Britain, for encouraging the Import of Organzined Silk, and of other Goods from certain Places therein named. (Repealed by Statute Law Revision (Ireland) Act 1879 (42 & 43 Vict. c. 24))
Controverted Elections Act 1781	21 & 22 Geo. 3. c. 10 (I)	12 February 1782
An Act to explain and amend an Act passed in the eleventh Year of His Present Majesty's Reign, entitled, "An Act to regulate the Trials of controverted Elections of Returns of Members to serve in Parliament." (Note: Controverted Elections Act 1770 (11 Geo. 3. c. 12 (I)))
Habeas Corpus Act 1781^{(Republic of Ireland)} or the Habeas Corpus Act (Ireland) 1781^{(United Kingdom)}	21 & 22 Geo. 3. c. 11 (I)	12 February 1782
An Act for better securing the Liberty of the Subject.
Dublin Leases Act 1781^{(Republic of Ireland)}	21 & 22 Geo. 3. c. 12 (I)	12 February 1782
An Act to receive and amend an Act passed in the seventeenth and eighteenth Years of his present Majesty’s Reign, intituled, "An Act for the further Improvement of the City of Dublin, in the Manner therein mentioned." (Note: Harcourt Street Act 1777 (17 & 18 Geo. 3. c. 46 (I)))
St. John's Hospital Limerick Act 1781	21 & 22 Geo. 3. c. 13 (I)	12 February 1782
An Act for extending the Provisions of an Act passed in this Kingdom in the sixth Year of the Reign of His present Majesty, entitled, "An Act for erecting and establishing publick Infirmaries or Hospitals in this Kingdom." (Note: County Hospitals Act 1765 (5 Geo. 3. c. 20 (I)))
Hawkers, Pedlars, and Schools Act 1781 (repealed)	21 & 22 Geo. 3. c. 14 (I)	4 May 1782
An Act for Licensing Hawkers and Pedlars; and for the Encouragement of English Protestant Schools, and for such other Purposes as are therein mentioned. (Repealed by Statute Law Revision (Ireland) Act 1879 (42 & 43 Vict. c. 24))
Revenue (No. 2) Act 1781 or the Revenue Frauds Act 1781 (repealed)	21 & 22 Geo. 3. c. 15 (I)	4 May 1782
An Act for continuing and amending several Laws relating to His Majesty's Revenue, and for the more effectually preventing of Frauds therein, and for such other Purposes as are therein mentioned. (Repealed by Statute Law Revision (Ireland) Act 1879 (42 & 43 Vict. c. 24))
Bank of Ireland Act 1781^{(Republic of Ireland)}	21 & 22 Geo. 3. c. 16 (I)	4 May 1782
An Act for establishing a Bank, by the Name of the Governors and Company of the Bank of Ireland.
Dublin Improvement and Coal Trade Act 1781 (repealed)	21 & 22 Geo. 3. c. 17 (I)	4 May 1782
An Act for the Improvement of the City of Dublin, by making wide and convenient Passages through the same, and for regulating the Coal Trade thereof. (Repealed by Statute Law Revision (Ireland) Act 1879 (42 & 43 Vict. c. 24))
Trials at Nisi Prius Act 1781 (repealed)	21 & 22 Geo. 3. c. 18 (I)	4 May 1782
An Act for enlarging the Time for Trials by Nisi Prius in the City of Dublin, and County of Dublin, and for making the Process of the Court of Exchequer more effectual against Persons, who being served therewith, refuse to appear. (Repealed by Statute Law Revision (Ireland) Act 1879 (42 & 43 Vict. c. 24))
Dublin Custom House Act 1781	21 & 22 Geo. 3. c. 19 (I)	4 May 1782
An Act for vesting in His Majesty, his Heirs and Successors, certain Premisses in the City of Dublin therein mentioned, for the Purposes of erecting a Custom-House thereon, with proper Accommodations suitable to the Trade of the said City, and sufficient for the Collection of His Majesty's Revenue.
State Debts Act 1781^{(Republic of Ireland)}	21 & 22 Geo. 3. c. 20 (I)	4 May 1782
An Act for the more speedy and effectual Recovery of the King's Debts.
Borough Elections (Ireland) Act 1781 or the Parliamentary Elections Act 1781 (repealed)	21 & 22 Geo. 3. c. 21 (I)	4 May 1782
An Act for the more effectually preventing the multiplying Votes at Elections of Members to serve in Parliament for Boroughs, where a Right of Voting is vested in the Protestant Inhabitants in general, or Protestant Inhabitants and others. (Repealed by Statute Law Revision (Ireland) Act 1879 (42 & 43 Vict. c. 24))
Dublin Butter Trade Act 1781 (repealed)	21 & 22 Geo. 3. c. 22 (I)	4 May 1782
An Act to explain and amend an Act made in the Nineteenth and Twentieth Years of his present Majesty, entitled, "An Act for regulating the curing and preparing Provisions, and for preventing Combinations among the several Tradesmen, and other Persons employed in making up such Provisions, and for regulating the Butter Trade in the City of Dublin, and for other Purposes therein mentioned;" (Note: Provisions and Butter Trade Act 1779 (19 & 20 Geo. 3. c. 36 (I))) or so much thereof as relates to the regulating the Butter Trade in the City of Dublin, County of the said City, and Liberties thereunto adjoining. (Repealed by Statute Law Revision (Ireland) Act 1879 (42 & 43 Vict. c. 24))
New Drapery Regulation Act 1781 or the Woollen Manufacture Act 1781	21 & 22 Geo. 3. c. 23 (I)	4 May 1782
An Act for repealing so much of an Act made in the Seventeenth and Eighteenth Years of the Reign of King Charles the Second, entitled, "An Act for the true making of all Sorts of Cloth called the Old and New Drapery, and the true searching and sealing thereof by His Majesty's Alnager within this Kingdom;" (Note: Alnage and Drapery Act 1665 (17 & 18 Chas. 2. c. 15 (I))) and also so much of an Act made in the Nineteenth and Twentieth Years of His Majesty's Reign, entitled, "An Act for the better Regulation of the Woollen Manufacture of this Kingdom," (Note: Woollen Manufacture Act 1779 (19 & 20 Geo. 3. c. 20 (I))) as relate to the New Drapery, Cottons, and Stockings, and for other Purposes.
Roman Catholic Relief Act 1782	21 & 22 Geo. 3. c. 24 (I)	4 May 1782
An Act for the further Relief of His Majesty's Subjects of this Kingdom professing the Popish Religion.
Protestant Dissenters Relief Act 1781 (repealed)	21 & 22 Geo. 3. c. 25 (I)	4 May 1782
An Act for the Relief of Protestant Dissenters, in certain Matters therein contained. (Repealed by Statute Law Revision (Ireland) Act 1879 (42 & 43 Vict. c. 24))
Popery Conformity Act 1781 (repealed)	21 & 22 Geo. 3. c. 26 (I)	4 May 1782
An Act for the rendering the Manner of conforming from the Popish to the Protestant Religion, more easy and expeditious. (Repealed by Promissory Oaths Act 1871 (34 & 35 Vict. c. 48))
Leases by Schools Act 1781^{(Republic of Ireland)}	21 & 22 Geo. 3. c. 27 (I)	4 May 1782
An Act to enable the Governors of any of the Schools founded in this Kingdom, to make long Leases of such Lands as have been granted for the Support of the said Schools, and are situate in Counties of Cities, and Counties of Towns.
Free Schools Act 1781 (repealed)	21 & 22 Geo. 3. c. 28 (I)	4 May 1782
An Act to amend the Laws for the erecting and regulating free Schools. (Repealed by Statute Law Revision (Ireland) Act 1879 (42 & 43 Vict. c. 24))
Dublin Bread and Flour Act 1781	21 & 22 Geo. 3. c. 29 (I)	4 May 1782
An Act for amending, altering, and continuing an Act, entitled, "An Act for regulating the Price and Assize of Bread, and preventing Frauds and Impositions in the Sale of Flour and other Articles sold by Weight or Measure in the County of Dublin.
Government Annuities Act 1781 (repealed)	21 & 22 Geo. 3. c. 30 (I)	4 May 1782
An Act to remove certain Doubts which have been conceived, concerning the Construction of three several Acts of Parliament passed in this Kingdom in the Reign of his present Majesty, for granting Annuities to such Persons as should voluntarily subscribe the Sums therein respectively mentioned. (Repealed by Statute Law Revision (Ireland) Act 1879 (42 & 43 Vict. c. 24))
Tithes and Dues Recovery Act 1781 (repealed)	21 & 22 Geo. 3. c. 31 (I)	4 May 1782
An Act to enable the Clergy to issue Process or Execution for Debts due for Tythes or Dues under five Pounds. (Repealed by Statute Law Revision (Ireland) Act 1879 (42 & 43 Vict. c. 24))
Barristers Admission Act 1781	21 & 22 Geo. 3. c. 32 (I)	4 May 1782
An Act to regulate the Admission of Barristers at Law.
Offices Qualification (No. 2) Act 1781 (repealed)	21 & 22 Geo. 3. c. 33 (I)	4 May 1782
An Act to regulate the Qualification of Persons appointed to Offices in this Kingdom, wherein two or more Grantees act under one Grant, Commission, or Appointment. (Repealed by Statute Law Revision (Ireland) Act 1879 (42 & 43 Vict. c. 24))
Sheriffs and Habeas Corpus Act 1781 (repealed)	21 & 22 Geo. 3. c. 34 (I)	4 May 1782
An Act for the Relief of Sheriffs from whom Prisoners in Execution for Debt shall be rescued in their Removal by Virtue of Writs of Habeas Corpus, in such Cases where the said Sheriffs shall appear to have been guilty of no Neglect or Default. (Repealed by Statute Law Revision (Ireland) Act 1879 (42 & 43 Vict. c. 24))
Bleaching and Linen Hall Act 1781	21 & 22 Geo. 3. c. 35 (I)	4 May 1782
An Act for prohibiting the Use of Lime in Bleaching, regulating Seal Masters of Linens, encouraging the Home Manufacture of Ashes for Bleachers Use, enlarging and rendering more commodious the Linen Hall in the City of Dublin, and other Purposes therein mentioned.
Corn Trade Act 1781 (repealed)	21 & 22 Geo. 3. c. 36 (I)	4 May 1782
An Act for the better regulating the Corn Trade of this Kingdom. (Repealed by Statute Law Revision (Ireland) Act 1879 (42 & 43 Vict. c. 24))
Fisheries Act 1781 (repealed)	21 & 22 Geo. 3. c. 37 (I)	4 May 1782
An Act to explain and amend the Acts for the Encouragement of the Fisheries of this Kingdom, and for promoting the good Ends proposed by said Laws. (Repealed by Statute Law Revision (Ireland) Act 1879 (42 & 43 Vict. c. 24))
Lottery Offices Act 1781	21 & 22 Geo. 3. c. 38 (I)	4 May 1782
An Act to amend an Act, entitled, "An Act for licensing and regulating Lottery Offices, and for other Purposes therein mentioned," (Note: Lottery Offices Act 1779 (19 & 20 Geo. 3. c. 31 (I))) made in the Nineteenth and Twentieth Years of His Majesty's Reign.
Dublin to Mullingar Road Act 1781	21 & 22 Geo. 3. c. 39 (I)	4 May 1782
An Act for the more effectual carrying into Execution the Several Laws relating to the Turnpike Road leading from the City of Dublin to Mullingar, and for enabling the Trustees of said Road to widen and make more convenient the Approaches from the Town of Chapelized to the City of Dublin, and for other Purposes; and for correcting a Mistake in an Act passed in the last Session of Parliament in this Kingdom, entitled, "An Act for making a Turnpike Road from Nenagh (Note: Nenagh, County Tipperary.) in the County of Tipperary, to O'Brien's Bridge (Note: O'Brien's Bridge, County Clare.) in the County of Clare." (Note: Nenagh to O'Brien's Bridge Road Act 1779 (19 & 20 Geo. 3. c. 46 (I)))
Expiring Laws Continuance Act 1781	21 & 22 Geo. 3. c. 40 (I)	4 May 1782
An Act for reviving, continuing, and amending several temporary Statutes.
Prisoners Discharge Act 1781 (repealed)	21 & 22 Geo. 3. c. 41 (I)	27 July 1782
An Act for discharging all Prisoners now confined in the several Gaols of this Kingdom for Fees only. (Repealed by Statute Law Revision (Ireland) Act 1879 (42 & 43 Vict. c. 24))
Gaols and Prisons Act 1781	21 & 22 Geo. 3. c. 42 (I)	27 July 1782
An Act for enforcing the due Execution of the Laws now in being, and for the better regulating the Publick Gaols and Prisons in this Kingdom, and providing necessary Accommodations for the Persons confined therein, and for the more effectual Administration of Justice at Sessions, and by Justices of the Peace in Cities and Counties of Cities within this Kingdom.
Mutiny Act (Ireland) 1781 (repealed)	21 & 22 Geo. 3. c. 43 (I)	27 July 1782
An Act for punishing Mutiny and Desertion, and for the better Payment of the Army and their Quarters; as also for the Repeal of an Act, entitled, "An Act for the better Accommodation and Regulation of His Majesty's Army in this Kingdom." (Note: Army Regulation Act 1779 (19 & 20 Geo. 3. c. 16 (I))) (Repealed by Statute Law Revision (Ireland) Act 1879 (42 & 43 Vict. c. 24))
Marine Mutiny Act (Ireland) 1781 (repealed)	21 & 22 Geo. 3. c. 44 (I)	27 July 1782
An Act for the Regulation of His Majesty's Marine Forces while on Shore. (Repealed by Statute Law Revision (Ireland) Act 1879 (42 & 43 Vict. c. 24))
Poor Relief Act 1781 (repealed)	21 & 22 Geo. 3. c. 45 (I)	27 July 1782
An Act to explain and amend an Act passed in the Eleventh and Twelfth Years of His present Majesty, entitled, "An Act for Badging such Poor as shall be found unable to Support themselves by Labour, and otherwise providing for them;" (Note: Badging and Begging (Ireland) Act 1771 (11 & 12 Geo. 3. c. 30 (I))) and for restraining such as shall be found able to support themselves by Labour and Industry from begging. (Repealed by Statute Law Revision (Ireland) Act 1879 (42 & 43 Vict. c. 24))
Partnerships Act 1781	21 & 22 Geo. 3. c. 46 (I)	27 July 1782
An Act to promote Trade and Manufacture, by regulating and encouraging Partnerships.
Parliament Act (Ireland) 1781 (repealed)	21 & 22 Geo. 3. c. 47 (I)	27 July 1782
An Act to regulate the Manner of passing Bills, and to prevent Delays in summoning of Parliaments. (Repealed by Statute Law Revision (Ireland) Act 1879 (42 & 43 Vict. c. 24))
Calendar Act 1781^{(Republic of Ireland)} or Yelverton's Act (Ireland) 1781^{(United Kingdom)}	21 & 22 Geo. 3. c. 48 (I)	27 July 1782
An Act for extending certain of the Provisions, contained in an Act, entitled, "An Act confirming all the Statutes made in England." (Note: Poynings' Act 1495 (10 Hen. 7. c. 22 (I)))
Judgments Redress Act 1781 (repealed)	21 & 22 Geo. 3. c. 49 (I)	27 July 1782
An Act for Redress of erroneous Judgments, Orders, and Decrees. (Repealed by Statute Law Revision (Ireland) Act 1879 (42 & 43 Vict. c. 24))
Courts Act 1781 (repealed)	21 & 22 Geo. 3. c. 50 (I)	27 July 1782
An Act for securing the Independency of Judges, and the impartial Administration of Justice. (Repealed for the Republic of Ireland by Statute Law Revision (Pre-Union Irish Statutes) Act 1962 (No. 29) and for Northern Ireland by Statute Law Revision Act 1950 (14 Geo. 6. c. 6))
Criminal Justice Act 1781 or the Criminal Justice (Venue) Act (Ireland) 1781^{(United Kingdom)} (repealed)	21 & 22 Geo. 3. c. 51 (I)	27 July 1782
An Act to amend an Act, intituled, "An Act for remitting of Prisoners, with their Indictments, by the Justices of His Majesty's Court of King's Bench, to the Places where the Crimes were committed." (Note: Criminal Justice Act 1771 (11 & 12 Geo. 3. c. 34 (I))) (Repealed for the Republic of Ireland by Statute Law Revision (Pre-Union Irish Statutes) Act 1962 (No. 29) and for Northern Ireland by Judicature (Northern Ireland) Act 1978 (c. 23))
Ecclesiastical Affairs Act 1781	21 & 22 Geo. 3. c. 52 (I)	27 July 1782
An Act to oblige Church-Wardens to account, pursuant to an Act (Note: Churches Repair Act 1729 (3 Geo. 2. c. 11 (I))) for the better keeping Churches in Repair, and to make the Cathedral Church of Ferns, the Parish Church of the Parish of Ferns.
Game Act 1781	21 & 22 Geo. 3. c. 53 (I)	27 July 1782
An Act for the Preservation of the Game.
Ransoming of Ships Act 1781 (repealed)	21 & 22 Geo. 3. c. 54 (I)	27 July 1782
An Act to prohibit the ransoming of Ships or Vessels captured from his Majesty's Subjects of this Kingdom, and of the Merchandize or Goods on board such Ships or Vessels. (Repealed by Statute Law Revision (Ireland) Act 1879 (42 & 43 Vict. c. 24))
Sugar Trade (No. 2) Act 1781 (repealed)	21 & 22 Geo. 3. c. 55 (I)	27 July 1782
An Act to allow the Importation of Goods of the Growth, Produce, or Manufacture of Saint Christophers, Nevis, and Montserrat, upon the like Duties as are payable upon the Importation of British Plantation Goods; and to amend an Act passed this Session of Parliament, entitled, "An Act for regulating the Sugar Trade, and for granting to his Majesty, his Heirs and Successors, the Duties therein mentioned." (Note: Sugar Trade Act 1781 (21 & 22 Geo. 3. c. 6 (I))) (Repealed by Statute Law Revision (Ireland) Act 1879 (42 & 43 Vict. c. 24))
Tobacco Importation Act 178 (repealed)	21 & 22 Geo. 3. c. 56 (I)	27 July 1782
An Act to permit the Importation of British Plantation Tobacco from any Port or Place, either in America, or the West Indies, or in Europe, during the present Hostilities. (Repealed by Statute Law Revision (Ireland) Act 1879 (42 & 43 Vict. c. 24))
Seceders Relief Act 1781 (repealed)	21 & 22 Geo. 3. c. 57 (I)	27 July 1782
An Act for the Relief of his Majesty's Protestant dissenting Subjects called Seceders. (Repealed by Promissory Oaths Act 1871 (34 & 35 Vict. c. 48))
Army Force Act 1781 (repealed)	21 & 22 Geo. 3. c. 58 (I)	27 July 1782
An Act for sparing to his Majesty, to be drawn out of this Kingdom whenever his Majesty shall think fit, a Force not exceeding Five Thousand Men, Part of the Troops appointed to remain in this Kingdom for its Defence. (Repealed by Statute Law Revision (Ireland) Act 1879 (42 & 43 Vict. c. 24))
Insolvent Debtors Act 1781 (repealed)	21 & 22 Geo. 3. c. 59 (I)	27 July 1782
An Act for the Relief of Insolvent Persons, under a certain Description. (Repealed by Statute Law Revision (Ireland) Act 1879 (42 & 43 Vict. c. 24))
Dublin Paving and Nuisances Act 1781	21 & 22 Geo. 3. c. 60 (I)	27 July 1782
An Act for paving and repairing the Streets, Squares, Lanes, Quays, and other Places in the City and County of the City of Dublin, and Liberties thereof, and for preventing and removing Obstructions, Nuisances, and Annoyances within the same, and for other Purposes therein mentioned.
Vexatious Arrests Act 1781 (repealed)	21 & 22 Geo. 3. c. 61 (I)	27 July 1782
An Act to explain and amend an Act, entitled, "An Act to prevent vexatious and frivolous Arrests, and for other Purposes." (Note: Frivolous Arrests Act 1779 (19 & 20 Geo. 3. c. 38 (I))) (Repealed by Statute Law Revision (Ireland) Act 1879 (42 & 43 Vict. c. 24))
Roman Catholic Relief Act 1781 or the Papists Education Act 1781 (repealed)	21 & 22 Geo. 3. c. 62 (I)	27 July 1782
An Act to allow Persons professing the Popish Religion to teach School in this Kingdom, and for regulating the Education of Papists, and also to repeal Parts of certain Laws relative to the Guardianship of their Children. (Repealed by Statute Law Revision (Ireland) Act 1879 (42 & 43 Vict. c. 24))
Borough Elections (Amendment) Act 1781	21 & 22 Geo. 3. c. 63 (I)	27 July 1782
An Act to explain and amend an Act passed this Session of Parliament, entitled, "An Act for the more effectually preventing the multiplying of Votes at Elections of Members to serve in Parliament for Boroughs, where the Right of Voting is vested in the Protestant Inhabitants in general, or Protestant Inhabitants and others." (Note: Borough Elections (Ireland) Act 1781 (21 & 22 Geo. 3. c. 21 (I)))
Kilkenny to Clonmell Road Act 1781	21 & 22 Geo. 3. c. 64 (I)	27 July 1782
An Act to continue and amend the Acts, now in Force for making and repairing the Roads leading from the City of Kilkenny, to the Town of Clonmell.

=== Private acts ===
Short title, or popular name	Citation	Royal assent
Long title
Glerawley and Fingal Agreement Act 1781	21 & 22 Geo. 3. c. 1 Pr. (I)	12 February 1782
An Act ratifying an agreement made between Francis Charles, Lord Viscount Glerawley, and Arthur Annesley, esquire, and Arthur James Plunkett, esquire, commonly called earl of Fingal, touching the lands of Killallon in the county of Meath, and for other purposes.
Lysaght's Estate Act 1781	21 & 22 Geo. 3. c. 2 Pr. (I)	12 February 1782
An Act for vesting lands and tenements in the county of Limerick, part of the estate of Nicholas Lysaght in the city of Cork, esquire, in trustees, for raising money to pay and discharge certain debts and encumbrances affecting the said Nicholas Lysaght.
Viscount Mountgarrett's Estate Act 1781	21 & 22 Geo. 3. c. 3 Pr. (I)	4 May 1782
An Act for confirming and establishing an agreement made between the Right Honourable Edmond, Lord Viscount Mountgarrett, as well on behalf of himself as on behalf of his sons, the Honourable Edmond Butler, the Honourable Somerset Richard Butler, the Honourable Henry Butler and the Honourable Pierce Butler, of the one part, and the Honourable and Reverend Richard Butler and the Honourable Simon Butler, of the other part, concerning certain parts of the real estate whereof Edmond, Lord Viscount Mountgarrett, their grandfather, and Edmond, Lord Viscount Mountgarrett, their father were in the lifetimes respectively seised, and for putting an end to all controversies respecting the same, and for other purposes therein mentioned.
Cooper's Estate Act 1781	21 & 22 Geo. 3. c. 4 Pr. (I)	27 July 1782
An Act for the sale of a competent part of the settled estates of Arthur Cooper, esquire, Sarah Cooper, otherwise Carlton, and William Henry Cooper, for the payment of debts and other encumbrances affecting the same, and for other purposes therein mentioned.
Ponsonby's Estate Act 1781	21 & 22 Geo. 3. c. 5 Pr. (I)	27 July 1782
An Act for vesting in trustees the settled estate of James Carrique Ponsonby, esquire, in the county of Limerick, and certain parts of his unsettled estate in the county of Kerry, in order to be sold or mortgaged for the payment of his debts, and for settling certain parts of the unsettled estate of the said James Carrique Ponsonby, in the said county of Kerry, in the place and stead of the said estate, so to be sold or mortgaged as aforesaid, and for other purposes.
Newburgh and Archdall Creditors Act 1781	21 & 22 Geo. 3. c. 6 Pr. (I)	27 July 1782
An Act for the relief of the creditors of Broghill Newburgh and Henry Archdall.
Gibbings' Divorce Act 1781	21 & 22 Geo. 3. c. 7 Pr. (I)	27 July 1782
An Act to dissolve the marriage of Richard Gibbings, clerk, with Alice Gibbings, otherwise Hyde, his now wife, and to enable him to marry again.

=== Sources ===
- "Acts of Parliament by Session: 1781". Irish Legislation Database. Queen's University Belfast.
- "Pre-Union Irish Statutes: 1781 Acts". Irish Statute Book. Attorney General of Ireland.

== 23 & 24 Geo. 3 (1783) ==
The 1st session of the 4th parliament of George III, which met from 14 October 1783 to 14 May 1784.

This session was also traditionally cited as 23 & 24 G. 3.

=== Public acts ===
Short title, or popular name	Citation	Royal assent
Long title
Import Duties and Prohibitions Act 1783 (repealed)	23 & 24 Geo. 3. c. 1 (I)	22 December 1783
An Act for granting unto his Majesty, his Heirs and Successors, an additional Duty on Wine, Hides, Beer, Ale, and other Goods and Merchandizes therein mentioned; and for prohibiting the Importation of all Gold and Silver Lace, and of all Cambricks and Lawns, except of the Manufacture of Great Britain; and of all Hops, except of the Growth of Great Britain, and the British Plantations; and of all Glass, except from Great Britain. (Repealed by Statute Law Revision (Ireland) Act 1879 (42 & 43 Vict. c. 24))
Government Loans and Duties Act 1783 (repealed)	23 & 24 Geo. 3. c. 2 (I)	22 December 1783
An Act for granting to his Majesty the several Aids, Duties, Rates, Impositions, and Taxes therein particularly expressed, to be applied to the Payment of the Interest of the Sums therein provided for, and towards the Discharge of the said principal Sums, in such Manner as therein is directed; and for such other Purposes as are therein mentioned. (Repealed by Statute Law Revision (Ireland) Act 1879 (42 & 43 Vict. c. 24))
Stamp Duties Act 1783 (repealed)	23 & 24 Geo. 3. c. 3 (I)	22 December 1783
An Act for granting to his Majesty, his Heirs and Successors, several Duties upon Stamped Vellum, Parchment, and Paper. (Repealed by Statute Law Revision (Ireland) Act 1879 (42 & 43 Vict. c. 24))
Sugar Trade Regulation Act 1783 (repealed)	23 & 24 Geo. 3. c. 4 (I)	22 December 1783
An Act for regulating the Sugar Trade, and for granting to his Majesty, his Heirs and Successors, the Duties therein mentioned. (Repealed by Statute Law Revision (Ireland) Act 1879 (42 & 43 Vict. c. 24))
Trade Advancement and Duties Act 1783 (repealed)	23 & 24 Geo. 3. c. 5 (I)	22 December 1783
An Act for the Advancement of Trade, and for granting to his Majesty, his Heirs and Successors, the several Duties therein mentioned. (Repealed by Statute Law Revision (Ireland) Act 1879 (42 & 43 Vict. c. 24))
Tobacco Trade Regulation Act 1783 (repealed)	23 & 24 Geo. 3. c. 6 (I)	22 December 1783
An Act for regulating and extending the Tobacco Trade, and for granting to his Majesty, his Heirs and Successors, the Duties therein mentioned. (Repealed by Statute Law Revision (Ireland) Act 1879 (42 & 43 Vict. c. 24))
Linen and Hempen Manufacture Act 1783 (repealed)	23 & 24 Geo. 3. c. 7 (I)	22 December 1783
An Act to promote the Linen and Hempen Manufacture, by encreasing the Supply of Irish Flax Seed, and encouraging the Export of Linens and Sail-Cloth, and for other Purposes therein mentioned. (Repealed by Statute Law Revision (Ireland) Act 1879 (42 & 43 Vict. c. 24))
Mutiny Act (Ireland) 1783 (repealed)	23 & 24 Geo. 3. c. 8 (I)	22 December 1783
An Act for punishing Mutiny and Desertion, and for the better Payment of the Army and their Quarters, within this Kingdom. (Repealed by Statute Law Revision (Ireland) Act 1879 (42 & 43 Vict. c. 24))
Trade with United States Act 1783 (repealed)	23 & 24 Geo. 3. c. 9 (I)	22 December 1783
An Act for facilitating the Trade and Intercourse between this Kingdom and the United States of America. (Repealed by Statute Law Revision (Ireland) Act 1879 (42 & 43 Vict. c. 24))
Lord Lieutenant's Proclamation Indemnity Act 1783 (repealed)	23 & 24 Geo. 3. c. 10 (I)	22 December 1783
An Act for indemnifying such Persons as have acted for the Service of the Publick, in advising or carrying into Execution a Proclamation of the Lord Lieutenant and Council of this Kingdom, bearing Date the Thirteenth Day of November, One thousand seven hundred and eighty-two; and also an Act of Council, or Entry in the Council-Books, bearing Date the Ninth Day of June, One thousand seven hundred and eighty-three. (Repealed by Statute Law Revision (Ireland) Act 1879 (42 & 43 Vict. c. 24))
Small Beer Price Regulation Act 1783	23 & 24 Geo. 3. c. 11 (I)	19 March 1784
An Act to enable the Commissioners of His Majesty's Revenue of Excise to impower the Brewers of Small Beer at certain Times, and under certain Circumstances, to charge an higher Price for Small Beer, than by Law than are enabled to charge for the same.
Prosperous Markets Act 1783^{(Republic of Ireland)}	23 & 24 Geo. 3. c. 12 (I)	19 March 1784
An Act for the issuing Treasury Bills to the Amount therein mentioned, for the Purpose of promoting Manufactures by providing for the Settlement of a Number of industrious Manufacturers at Prosperous in the County of Kildare.
Parliamentary Elections Bribery Act 1783	23 & 24 Geo. 3. c. 13 (I)	19 March 1784
An Act to amend an Act, entitled, "An Act for preventing Bribery and Corruption in Elections for Members to serve in Parliament." (Note: Bribery and Corruption Act 1763 (3 Geo. 3. c. 13 (I)))
Admiralty Act 1783^{(Republic of Ireland)}	23 & 24 Geo. 3. c. 14 (I)	19 March 1784
An Act for regulating the High Court of Admiralty in this Kingdom.
Prize Ship Vriendscap Act 1783Cargo of the Ship Vriendscap Act 1783	23 & 24 Geo. 3. c. 15 (I)	19 March 1784
An Act for the Relief of the several Persons interested in the Ship Vriendscap, and her Cargo, which were captured by two British Privateers, and brought as a Prize into the Port of Cork, in the Year One thousand seven hundred and seventy-nine.
Indemnity Act (Ireland) 1783 (repealed)	23 & 24 Geo. 3. c. 16 (I)	19 March 1784
An Act for Relief of Persons who have omitted to qualify themselves according to Law. (Repealed by Statute Law Revision (Ireland) Act 1879 (42 & 43 Vict. c. 24))
Post Office Act 1783 (repealed)	23 & 24 Geo. 3. c. 17 (I)	14 May 1784
An Act for establishing a Post-Office within this Kingdom. (Repealed by Post Office (Repeal of Laws) Act 1837 (7 Will. 4 & 1 Vict. c. 32))
Imported Hops Duties Act 1783 (repealed)	23 & 24 Geo. 3. c. 18 (I)	14 May 1784
An Act for granting to His Majesty, His Heirs and Successors, a further Additional Duty on imported Hops, and other Duties herein mentioned. (Repealed by Statute Law Revision (Ireland) Act 1879 (42 & 43 Vict. c. 24))
Corn Trade and Agriculture Act 1783 (repealed)	23 & 24 Geo. 3. c. 19 (I)	14 May 1784
An Act for regulating the Corn Trade, promoting Agriculture, and providing a regular and steady Supply of Corn in this Kingdom, and for granting to His Majesty, His Heirs and Successors, the Duties therein mentioned. (Repealed by Statute Law Revision (Ireland) Act 1879 (42 & 43 Vict. c. 24))
Obstruction of Trade Act 1783^{(Republic of Ireland)}	23 & 24 Geo. 3. c. 20 (I)	14 May 1784
An Act for the more effectually punishing such Persons as shall by Violence obstruct the Freedom of Corn Markets and the Corn Trade; or who shall be guilty of other Offences therein mentioned, and for making Satisfaction to the Parties injured.
Hawkers and Pedlars Act 1783 (repealed)	23 & 24 Geo. 3. c. 21 (I)	14 May 1784
An Act for licensing Hawkers and Pedlars, and for the Encouragement of English Protestant Schools. (Repealed by Statute Law Revision (Ireland) Act 1879 (42 & 43 Vict. c. 24))
Funds in Chancery Act 1783 (repealed)	23 & 24 Geo. 3. c. 22 (I)	14 May 1784
An Act for better securing the Monies and Effects of the Suitors of the Court of Chancery, and the Court of Exchequer, by depositing the same in the National Bank; and to prevent the forging and counterfeiting any Draft, Order, or other Voucher, for the Payment or Delivery of such Money or Effects, and for other Purposes. (Repealed for the Republic of Ireland by Statute Law Revision (Pre-Union Irish Statutes) Act 1962 (No. 29) and for Northern Ireland by the Statute Law Revision Act 1950 (14 Geo. 6. c. 6))
Plate Assay Act 1783^{(Republic of Ireland)} (repealed)	23 & 24 Geo. 3. c. 23 (I)	14 May 1784
An Act to regulate the Assay of Gold, and promote the Manufacture of Gold and Silver Wares in this Kingdom. (Repealed by Hallmarking Act 1973 (c. 43))
Malt Measurement Act 1783	23 & 24 Geo. 3. c. 24 (I)	14 May 1784
An Act for the buying and selling of Malt by Measure, and for the more effectual preventing the Frauds committed in the buying, selling, and Delivery thereof.
Spices Trade Act 1783 (repealed)	23 & 24 Geo. 3. c. 25 (I)	14 May 1784
An Act for regulating the Import of Cinnamon, Cloves, Mace, and Nutmegs, and for the better collecting the Duties thereon. (Repealed by Statute Law Revision (Ireland) Act 1879 (42 & 43 Vict. c. 24))
Public Money Accounting Act 1783	23 & 24 Geo. 3. c. 26 (I)	14 May 1784
An Act for the due accounting for all Money granted for Publick Works, Charities, and Hospitals therein mentioned; and for the ordering a regular Account in future of all Monies entrusted to the Corporation for carrying on the Inland Navigation; the Trustees of the Linen Manufacture; the Dublin Society; the Corporation for paving the Streets of Dublin, and for other Purposes therein mentioned.
Dundalk to Bannbridge Road Act 1783	23 & 24 Geo. 3. c. 27 (I)	14 May 1784
An Act for the more effectually amending and repairing the Road leading from the Town of Dundalk, in the County of Louth, to Bannbridge in the County of Down; and for the better securing the Debts which are now due to the Creditors of the said Road.
Freedom of the Press Act 1783	23 & 24 Geo. 3. c. 28 (I)	14 May 1784
An Act to secure the Liberty of the Press, by preventing the Abuses arising from the Publication of traiterous, seditious, false, and slanderous Libels by Persons unknown.
Revenue Laws Act 1783 (repealed)	23 & 24 Geo. 3. c. 29 (I)	14 May 1784
An Act for continuing and amending several Laws relating to His Majesty's Revenue, and for the more effectually preventing of Frauds therein. (Repealed by Statute Law Revision (Ireland) Act 1879 (42 & 43 Vict. c. 24))
Justices of the Peace Qualification Act 1783	23 & 24 Geo. 3. c. 30 (I)	14 May 1784
An Act for ascertaining the Qualification of such Persons as shall take out Commissions of the Peace for Counties at large.
Dublin Improvement Act 1783	23 & 24 Geo. 3. c. 31 (I)	14 May 1784
An Act for continuing and amending an Act passed in the Twenty second Year of His present Majesty's Reign, entitled, "An Act for the Improvement of the City of Dublin, by making wide and convenient Passages through the same, and for regulating the Coal Trade thereof, and for other Purposes." (Note: Dublin Improvement and Coal Trade Act 1781 (21 & 22 Geo. 3. c. 17 (I)))
Trade with United States (No. 2) Act 1783 (repealed)	23 & 24 Geo. 3. c. 32 (I)	14 May 1784
An Act for continuing an Act, entitled, "An Act for facilitating the Trade and Intercourse between this Kingdom and the United States of America," (Note: Trade with United States Act 1783 (23 & 24 Geo. 3. c. 9 (I))) and for furthering the said Trade and Intercourse. (Repealed by Statute Law Revision (Ireland) Act 1879 (42 & 43 Vict. c. 24))
Manufactures Bounties Act 1783 (repealed)	23 & 24 Geo. 3. c. 33 (I)	14 May 1784
An Act for directing the Application of the Sum of Fifteen Thousand Pounds, granted by an Act passed this Session of Parliament, (Note: Import Duties and Prohibitions Act 1783 (23 & 24 Geo. 3. c. 1 (I))) for the Purpose of paying Bounties on the Sale of the following Manufactures of this Kingdom, that is to say, the Manufactures of Wool, of Wool mixed, of Cotton, Cotton mixed, Thread, Kentings, and Manufactures of Iron or Copper. (Repealed by Statute Law Revision (Ireland) Act 1879 (42 & 43 Vict. c. 24))
Prisoners' Fees Act 1783^{(Republic of Ireland)}	23 & 24 Geo. 3. c. 34 (I)	14 May 1784
An Act for the Relief of Prisoners charged with Felony, or other Crimes, who shall be acquitted or discharged by Proclamation respecting their Fees, and giving a Recompence for such Fees.
Dublin Glass Houses Act 1783 (repealed)	23 & 24 Geo. 3. c. 35 (I)	14 May 1784
An Act to prevent the pernicious Practice of erecting Glass Houses within the City of Dublin, or a certain Distance thereof. (Repealed by Statute Law Revision (Ireland) Act 1879 (42 & 43 Vict. c. 24))
Privilege of Parliament Act 1783 (repealed)	23 & 24 Geo. 3. c. 36 (I)	14 May 1784
An Act to continue an Act passed in the Eleventh and Twelfth Years of the Reign of His present Majesty, entitled, "An Act for the further preventing Delays of Justice by Reason of Privilege of Parliament." (Note: Privilege of Parliament Act 1771 (11 & 12 Geo. 3. c. 12 (I))) (Repealed by Statute Law Revision (Ireland) Act 1879 (42 & 43 Vict. c. 24))
Proclamation Indemnity Act 1783 (repealed)	23 & 24 Geo. 3. c. 37 (I)	14 May 1784
An Act for indemnifying such Person or Persons as have acted for the Service of the Public, in advising or carrying into Execution a Proclamation of the Lord Lieutenant and Privy Council of this Kingdom, bearing Date the Twenty seventh Day of January, One thousand seven hundred and eighty four. (Repealed by Statute Law Revision (Ireland) Act 1879 (42 & 43 Vict. c. 24))
Naturalization Act 1783 (repealed)	23 & 24 Geo. 3. c. 38 (I)	14 May 1784
An Act for extending the Provisions of an Act passed in this Kingdom in the Nineteenth and Twentieth Years of His Majesty's Resign, entitled "An Act for naturalizing such Foreign Merchants, Traders, Artificers, Artizans, Manufacturers, Workmen, Seamen, Farmers, and others, as shall settle in this Kingdom." (Note: Naturalization Act 1779 (19 & 20 Geo. 3. c. 29 (I))) (Repealed by Naturalization Act 1870 (33 & 34 Vict. c. 14))
Timber Act 1783^{(Republic of Ireland)}	23 & 24 Geo. 3. c. 39 (I)	14 May 1784
An Act to amend the Laws for the Encouragement of planting Timber Trees.
Inland Fisheries Act 1783 (repealed)	23 & 24 Geo. 3. c. 40 (I)	14 May 1784
An Act for the Protection and Improvement of the Inland Fisheries of this Kingdom. (Repealed by Fisheries (Ireland) Act 1842 (5 & 6 Vict. c. 106))
Prisons Act 1783	23 & 24 Geo. 3. c. 41 (I)	14 May 1784
An Act for altering, amending, and rendering more effectual the Laws now in being, for regulating and managing the Publick Gaols and Prisons throughout this Kingdom.
Roads Amendment Act 1783	23 & 24 Geo. 3. c. 42 (I)	14 May 1784
An Act to further amend and explain an Act made in the Twelfth Year of His present Majesty's Reign, entitled, "An Act for the making of narrow Roads through the mountainous unimproved Parts of this Kingdom;" (Note: Narrow Roads (Ireland) Act 1771 (11 & 12 Geo. 3. c. 20 (I))) and also an Act made in the Seventeenth and Eighteenth Years of His present Majesty's Reign, (Note: Public Roads Amendment Act 1777 (17 & 18 Geo. 3. c. 22 (I))) entitled, "An Act to amend an Act passed in the Thirteenth and Fourteenth Years of His present Majesty's Reign, (Note: Public Roads Act 1773 (13 & 14 Geo. 3. c. 32 (I))) entitled, 'An Act for amending the Public Roads.'"
Creditors of John Tunnadine Act 1783	23 & 24 Geo. 3. c. 43 (I)	14 May 1784
An Act for the Relief of the Creditors of John Tunnadine, Esquire, late one of the Masters of the High Court of Chancery in Ireland, and for vesting the Estates, Real and Personal of the said John Tunnadine, in Commissioners and Assignees for the Payment of his said Creditors.
Limerick Gaol Act 1783	23 & 24 Geo. 3. c. 44 (I)	14 May 1784
An Act for the Erecting and Building of a new and convenient Gaol and Marshalsea in the City of Limerick for the County, and County of the City of Limerick; and to enable certain Trustees or Commissioners therein named, to purchase Ground whereon to erect and build the same.
Receivers of Stolen Goods Act 1783 (repealed)	23 & 24 Geo. 3. c. 45 (I)	14 May 1784
An Act for the more easy Discovery and effectual Punishment of Buyers and Receivers of Stolen Goods. (Repealed by Criminal Statutes (Ireland) Repeal Act 1828 (9 Geo. 4. c. 53))
Landlord and Tenant Act 1783 (repealed)	23 & 24 Geo. 3. c. 46 (I)	14 May 1784
An Act for the Apportionment and more easy Recovery of Rents in certain Cases. (Repealed by Landlord and Tenant Law Amendment (Ireland) Act 1860 (23 & 24 Vict. c. 154))
Quit and Crown Rents Arrears Act 1783 (repealed)	23 & 24 Geo. 3. c. 47 (I)	14 May 1784
An Act for discharging certain Arrears of Quit, Crown, and Composition Rents, which have been growing due for Twenty Years last past, on the Terms, and in the Manner therein mentioned. (Repealed by Statute Law Revision (Ireland) Act 1879 (42 & 43 Vict. c. 24))
Ship Salvage Act 1783 (repealed)	23 & 24 Geo. 3. c. 48 (I)	14 May 1784
An Act for the Amendment of the Law in Relation to the Salvage of Ships and Goods stranded, or in Danger of perishing at Sea. (Repealed by Wreck and Salvage Act 1846 (9 & 10 Vict. c. 99))
Endowments of Parishes, Glebe Lands, etc. Act 1783	23 & 24 Geo. 3. c. 49 (I)	14 May 1784
An Act for making Appropriate Parishes belonging to Archbishops and Bishops perpetual Cures, and the better to enable such Archbishops and Bishops to endow and augment the Endowments of Vicarages and Curacies to them respective appropriate, and to render more effectual the several Acts now in Force, to enable the Clergy having Cure of Souls to reside upon their respective Benefices, and to build on their respective Glebe Lands.
Coinage Offences Act 1783 (repealed)	23 & 24 Geo. 3. c. 50 (I)	14 May 1784
An Act for more effectually preventing the counterfeiting of the current Coin of this Kingdom, and the uttering or paying of false or counterfeit Coin. (Repealed by Coinage Offences Act 1832 (2 & 3 Will. 4. c. 34))
Settlement of Citizens of Geneva on Crown Lands in Waterford Act 1783	23 & 24 Geo. 3. c. 51 (I)	14 May 1784
An Act for vesting the Lands of Knockroe, and other Lands in the County of Waterford, in His Majesty, His Heirs and Successors, to the Uses therein expressed, and for other Purposes.
City of Waterford Act 1783^{(Republic of Ireland)}	23 & 24 Geo. 3. c. 52 (I)	14 May 1784
An Act for better Regulating the Police of the City of Waterford.
Linen and Hempen Manufactures Act 1783	23 & 24 Geo. 3. c. 53 (I)	14 May 1784
An Act for further promoting the Linen and Hempen Manufactures.
Expiring Laws Continuance Act 1783 (repealed)	23 & 24 Geo. 3. c. 54 (I)	14 May 1784
An Act for reviving and continuing Temporary Statutes. (Repealed by Statute Law Revision (Ireland) Act 1879 (42 & 43 Vict. c. 24))
Pawnbrokers Act 1783 (repealed)	23 & 24 Geo. 3. c. 55 (I)	14 May 1784
An Act to remove Doubts and Scruples with Respect to the Construction of an Act passed in this Kingdom, in the Fifth Year of His late Majesty King George the Second, entitled, "An Act for reducing the Interest of Money to Six per Cent." (Note: Pawnbrokers Act 1731 (5 Geo. 2. c. 7 (I))) (Repealed by Statute Law Revision (Ireland) Act 1879 (42 & 43 Vict. c. 24))
Houghers Act 1783 (repealed)	23 & 24 Geo. 3. c. 56 (I)	14 May 1784
An Act for the more effectual Discovery and Prosecution of Offenders called Houghers, and for the Support and Maintenance of Soldiers or others houghed, (Note: 'Houghing' is another term for hamstringing.) maimed, and disabled by such Offenders. (Repealed by Statute Law Revision (Ireland) Act 1879 (42 & 43 Vict. c. 24))
Rotunda Hospital Act 1783	23 & 24 Geo. 3. c. 57 (I)	14 May 1784
An Act for the more effectually Paving, Cleansing, and Lighting of the Streets of the City of Dublin, and other Places therein mentioned; and for making Sewers, and erecting Fountains and Conduits in the said City, for the Use of the Poor, and for other Purposes therein mentioned.
Poor Relief (Badging) Act 1783 (repealed)	23 & 24 Geo. 3. c. 58 (I)	14 May 1784
An Act to explain an Act passed in the Eleventh and Twelfth Years of His present Majesty, entitled, "An Act for Badging such Poor as shall be found unable to support themselves by Labour, and otherwise providing for them;" (Note: Badging and Begging (Ireland) Act 1771 (11 & 12 Geo. 3. c. 30 (I))) and for restraining such as shall be found able to support themselves by Labour or Industry from Begging, and to extend the Provisions thereof. (Repealed by Statute Law Revision (Ireland) Act 1879 (42 & 43 Vict. c. 24))
Disability of Lord Strangford Act 1783	23 & 24 Geo. 3. c. 59 (I)	14 May 1784
An Act for disabling Philip Lord Viscount Strangford, from sitting in Parliament, or making any Proxy therein, and also from sitting and voting on the Trial of any Peer.

=== Private acts ===
Short title, or popular name	Citation	Royal assent
Long title
Donnellan's Estate Act 1783	23 & 24 Geo. 3. c. 1 Pr. (I)	14 May 1784
An Act for exemplifying or enrolling the last will and testament of Gilbert Donnellan, formerly of Cloghan in the county of Roscommon and kingdom of Ireland, but late of Mons in French Flanders, esquire, deceased, and making the same evidence both in law and equity.
Arcedeckne's Estate Act 1783	23 & 24 Geo. 3. c. 2 Pr. (I)	14 May 1784
An Act for vesting certain lands therein mentioned, late the estate of Nicholas Arcedeckne of Gortnamona in the county of Galway, esquire, deceased, in trustees for payment of debts and encumbrances affecting the same.
Uniacke's Estate Act 1783	23 & 24 Geo. 3. c. 3 Pr. (I)	14 May 1784
An Act for vesting in trustees certain lands and tenements in the county of Cork for raising a sum for payment of the debts of James Uniacke, esquire.
Mason's Estate Act 1783	23 & 24 Geo. 3. c. 4 Pr. (I)	14 May 1784
An Act for vesting lands and hereditaments in the county of Galway, part of the estate of John Monck Mason of the city of Dublin, esquire, in trustees, for raising money to pay and discharge debts and encumbrances affecting the said John Monck Mason.
Holmes' Estate Act 1783	23 & 24 Geo. 3. c. 5 Pr. (I)	14 May 1784
An Act for vesting certain lands in the King's County, part of the estate of Peter Holmes of Johnstown in the county of Tipperary, esquire, in trustees, to be sold for the payment of debts affecting the same, and for appointing other lands to the uses for which the said King's County estate had been settled.
Gorges' Estate Act 1783	23 & 24 Geo. 3. c. 6 Pr. (I)	14 May 1784
An Act to enable the trustees in the marriage settlement of Hamilton Gorges of Kilbrew in the county of Meath, esquire, to convey the fee and inheritance instead of a trust term of 400 years of and in certain lands, the estate of the said Hamilton Gorges, decreed to be sold by the court of chancery for the payment of the several debts in the said decree mentioned.
Enery's Estate Act 1783	23 & 24 Geo. 3. c. 7 Pr. (I)	14 May 1784
An Act for vesting certain towns, lands, tenements and hereditaments situate in the counties of Cavan, Fermanagh and Longford, the estate of John Enery of Bawnboy in the county of Cavan, esquire, in trustees, in order that the same, or a competent part thereof, may be sold for payment of debts and encumbrances affecting certain lands situate in the county of Cavan, the estate of the said John Enery, and for settling the said lands in the said county of Cavan to the same uses to which the said estates in the said counties of Fermanagh and Longford had been settled, and for other purposes.
Sidney Estate Act 1783^{(Republic of Ireland)}	23 & 24 Geo. 3. c. 8 Pr. (I)	14 May 1784
An Act for vesting certain lands, tenements and hereditaments in the Queen's County, formerly the estate of the Right Honourable Dudley Alexander Sidney Cosby, late Lord Sidney of Leix and baron of Stradbally, deceased, in trustees for raising a sum of money sufficient to discharge the encumbrances affecting the same and other purposes, and to enable the several persons entitled thereto to make building leases of part thereof.
Gore's Estate Act 1783	23 & 24 Geo. 3. c. 9 Pr. (I)	14 May 1784
An Act for vesting several towns, lands, tenements and hereditaments in the counties of Wexford, Mayo and Sligo, the estate of the Honourable Richard Gore, in trustees in order the same may be sold for the payment of debts and encumbrances affecting the same, and other purposes.
Pole's Estate Act 1783	23 & 24 Geo. 3. c. 10 Pr. (I)	14 May 1784
An Act to enable the Honourable William Wesley Pole, and the several other persons in remainder under the will and codicils of William Pole, esquire, deceased, to settle jointures, and for other purposes.
Mathew's Estate Act 1783	23 & 24 Geo. 3. c. 11 Pr. (I)	14 May 1784
An Act to explain and amend an act passed in this kingdom in the 20th year of his present majesty's reign entitled "An Act for vesting in trustees certain lands and tenements, the estate of Francis Mathew of Thomastown in the county of Tipperary in the kingdom of Ireland, esquire, for the purpose of raising a sufficient sum of money for the payment of debts affecting the same," (Note: Mathew's Estate Act 1779 (19 & 20 Geo. 3. c. 3 Pr. (I))) and for other purposes in said act mentioned.
Lord Carysfort's Estate Act 1783	23 & 24 Geo. 3. c. 12 Pr. (I)	14 May 1784
An act enabling the Right Honourable John Joshua, Lord Carysfort, Baron of Carysfort, to make long leases of his estate in the county of Dublin, and part of his estate in the county of Wicklow.
Earl of Louth's Estate Act 1783	23 & 24 Geo. 3. c. 13 Pr. (I)	14 May 1784
An Act for vesting certain lands and premises therein mentioned, part of the estate of the Right Honourable Thomas, earl of Louth, in trustees, for raising a sum not exceeding £6,000 by sale or mortgage of a competent part thereof, to be applied to the purposes therein mentioned.

=== Sources ===
- The Parliamentary Register. Vol. III: The First Session of the Fourth Parliament in the Reign of His Present Majesty. Dublin: Byrne and Porter – via Google Books.
- "Acts of Parliament by Session: 1783". Irish Legislation Database. Queen's University Belfast.

== 25 Geo. 3 (1785) ==
The 2nd session of the 4th parliament of George III, which met from 20 January 1785 to 7 September 1785.

This session was also traditionally cited as 25 G. 3.

=== Public acts ===
Short title, or popular name	Citation	Royal assent
Long title
Wines, Hides, Beer, and Import Duties Act 1785 (repealed)	25 Geo. 3. c. 1 (I)	24 March 1785
An Act for granting unto his majesty, his heirs and successors an additional duty on wine, hides, beer, ale and other goods and merchandises therein mentioned, and for prohibiting the importation of all gold and silver lace, and of all cambrics and lawns, except of the manufacture of Great Britain, and of all hops, except of the growth of Great Britain. (Repealed by Statute Law Revision (Ireland) Act 1879 (42 & 43 Vict. c. 24))
Aids, Duties, Rates, and Taxes Act 1785 (repealed)	25 Geo. 3. c. 2 (I)	24 March 1785
An Act for granting unto his majesty the several aids, duties, rates, impositions and taxes therein particularly expressed to be expressed to be applied to the payment of the interest of the sums therein provided for, and towards the discharge of the said principal sums in such manner as therein is directed, and for such other purposes as are therein mentioned. (Repealed by Statute Law Revision (Ireland) Act 1879 (42 & 43 Vict. c. 24))
Malt Duties Act 1785 (repealed)	25 Geo. 3. c. 3 (I)	24 March 1785
An Act for granting to his majesty, his heirs and successors certain duties upon malt. (Repealed by Statute Law Revision (Ireland) Act 1879 (42 & 43 Vict. c. 24))
Advancement of Trade Act 1785 (repealed)	25 Geo. 3. c. 4 (I)	24 March 1785
An Act for the advancement of trade, and for granting to his majesty, his heirs and successors, the several duties therein mentioned. (Repealed by Statute Law Revision (Ireland) Act 1879 (42 & 43 Vict. c. 24))
Sugar Trade Regulation Act 1785 (repealed)	25 Geo. 3. c. 5 (I)	24 March 1785
An Act for regulating the sugar trade, and for granting to his majesty, his heirs and successors the several duties therein mentioned. (Repealed by Statute Law Revision (Ireland) Act 1879 (42 & 43 Vict. c. 24))
Tobacco Trade Regulation Act 1785 (repealed)	25 Geo. 3. c. 6 (I)	24 March 1785
An Act for regulating and extending the tobacco trade, and for granting to his majesty, his heirs and successors the duties therein mentioned. (Repealed by Statute Law Revision (Ireland) Act 1879 (42 & 43 Vict. c. 24))
Coffee Duties Act 1785 (repealed)	25 Geo. 3. c. 7 (I)	24 March 1785
An Act for granting unto his majesty, his heirs and successors the several duties therein mentioned upon coffee. (Repealed by Statute Law Revision (Ireland) Act 1879 (42 & 43 Vict. c. 24))
Licences Duties Act 1785 (repealed)	25 Geo. 3. c. 8 (I)	24 March 1785
An Act for granting certain duties upon licences to be taken out by the several persons therein mentioned. (Repealed by Statute Law Revision (Ireland) Act 1879 (42 & 43 Vict. c. 24))
Carriages Duties Act 1785 (repealed)	25 Geo. 3. c. 9 (I)	24 March 1785
An Act for granting unto his majesty, his heirs and successors certain duties on carriages. (Repealed by Statute Law Revision (Ireland) Act 1879 (42 & 43 Vict. c. 24))
Corn Trade and Agriculture Act 1785 (repealed)	25 Geo. 3. c. 10 (I)	24 March 1785
An Act for explaining and amending an Act for regulating the Corn Trade, promoting Agriculture, and providing a regular and steady Supply of Corn in this Kingdom, and for granting to His Majesty, his Heirs and Successors, the Duties herein mentioned. (Repealed by Statute Law Revision (Ireland) Act 1879 (42 & 43 Vict. c. 24))
Linen and Hempen Manufactures (Flax Seed) Act 1785 (repealed)	25 Geo. 3. c. 11 (I)	24 March 1785
An Act to promote the linen and hempen manufactures, by increasing the supply of Irish flax seed, and encouraging the export of linen and sail cloth, and for granting to his majesty, his heirs and successors the duties therein mentioned. (Repealed by Statute Law Revision (Ireland) Act 1879 (42 & 43 Vict. c. 24))
Flaxen and Hempen Manufactures Act 1785 (repealed)	25 Geo. 3. c. 12 (I)	24 March 1785
An Act for granting the Sum of Four Thousand Pounds to the Persons, and for the Purposes therein mentioned, and for continuing an Act passed in this Kingdom in the Third Year of His Majesty's Reign, entitled, "An Act for continuing the Encouragement given by former Acts of Parliament to the Flaxen and Hempen Manufactures." (Note: Flaxen and Hempen Manufactures Act 1763 (3 Geo. 3. c. 12 (I))) (Repealed by Statute Law Revision (Ireland) Act 1879 (42 & 43 Vict. c. 24))
Trade Bounties Regulation Act 1785 (repealed)	25 Geo. 3. c. 13 (I)	4 April 1785
An Act for the better Encouragement of Trade, by regulating the Payment of Bounties, and exempting them from Fees. (Repealed by Statute Law Revision (Ireland) Act 1879 (42 & 43 Vict. c. 24))
Miscellaneous Trustees Grant Act 1785 (repealed)	25 Geo. 3. c. 14 (I)	4 April 1785
An Act for granting the sum of £20,000 to the speaker of the house of commons, the chancellor of the exchequer, the deputy vice-treasurer, the teller of the exchequer, the senior commissioner of his majesty's revenue, the Right Honourable Thomas Conolly and the Right Honourable Luke Gardiner, or any four of them, for the purposes therein mentioned. (Repealed by Statute Law Revision (Ireland) Act 1879 (42 & 43 Vict. c. 24))
Trade with United States Act 1785 (repealed)	25 Geo. 3. c. 15 (I)	4 April 1785
An Act for continuing an act entitled "An Act for facilitating the trade and intercourse between this kingdom and the United States of America," (Note: Trade with United States Act 1783 (23 & 24 Geo. 3. c. 9 (I))) and furthering the said trade and intercourse, and for prohibiting the import of tobacco not being of the growth of the said states, or of the British plantations or Great Britain. (Repealed by Statute Law Revision (Ireland) Act 1879 (42 & 43 Vict. c. 24))
Protestant Charter Schools Grant Act 1785 (repealed)	25 Geo. 3. c. 16 (I)	24 March 1785
An Act for granting the sum of £9,000 to the Incorporated Society for Supporting the Protestant Charter Schools of this Kingdom. (Repealed by Statute Law Revision (Ireland) Act 1879 (42 & 43 Vict. c. 24))
Seducing Artificers and Exporting Tools Prevention Act 1785 (repealed)	25 Geo. 3. c. 17 (I)	4 April 1785
An Act to prevent the Practice of seducing Artificers and Manufacturers of this Kingdom, and of exporting the Tools and Utensils made Use of in preparing and working up the Manufactures thereof, into Parts beyond the Seas. (Repealed by Statute Law Revision (Ireland) Act 1879 (42 & 43 Vict. c. 24))
Stamp Duties Act 1785 (repealed)	25 Geo. 3. c. 18 (I)	24 March 1785
An Act for granting to his majesty, his heirs and successors the several duties therein mentioned, to be levied by the commissioners for managing the stamp duties. (Repealed by Statute Law Revision (Ireland) Act 1879 (42 & 43 Vict. c. 24))
Post Office Act 1785 (repealed)	25 Geo. 3. c. 19 (I)	24 March 1785
An Act for granting to His Majesty, His Heirs and Successors, certain Duties and Rates upon the Portage and Conveyance of all Letters and Packets within this Kingdom; and for explaining and amending an Act passed in the Twenty-third and Twenty-fourth Years of His Majesty's Reign, entitled, "An Act for establishing a Post Office within this Kingdom." (Note: Post Office Act 1783 (23 & 24 Geo. 3. c. 17 (I))) (Repealed by Statute Law Revision (Ireland) Act 1879 (42 & 43 Vict. c. 24))
Hawkers and Pedlars Licensing Act 1785 (repealed)	25 Geo. 3. c. 20 (I)	24 March 1785
An Act for licensing hawkers and pedlars, petty chapmen and other persons. (Repealed by Statute Law Revision (Ireland) Act 1879 (42 & 43 Vict. c. 24))
Ecclesiastical Dilapidations Act 1785 or the See-House in Limerick Act 1785	25 Geo. 3. c. 21 (I)	24 March 1785
An Act to explain and amend the several Acts made in this Kingdom to encourage the building of Houses, and making other Improvements on Church-Lands, and to prevent Dilapidations.
Dublin Poor Relief Grant Act 1785 (repealed)	25 Geo. 3. c. 22 (I)	24 March 1785
An Act for granting the sum of £8,600 to the corporation for the relief of the poor of the city of Dublin. (Repealed by Statute Law Revision (Ireland) Act 1879 (42 & 43 Vict. c. 24))
Hibernian School Grant Act 1785 (repealed)	25 Geo. 3. c. 23 (I)	24 March 1785
An Act for granting the sum of £1,000 to the governors of the Hibernian School, for the support of that charity. (Repealed by Statute Law Revision (Ireland) Act 1879 (42 & 43 Vict. c. 24))
Lord Chancellor and Chief Judges Grant Act 1785 (repealed)	25 Geo. 3. c. 24 (I)	24 March 1785
An Act for granting the sum of £3,000 to the lord chancellor and chief judges for the purposes therein mentioned. (Repealed by Statute Law Revision (Ireland) Act 1879 (42 & 43 Vict. c. 24))
Hibernian Marine Society Grant Act 1785 (repealed)	25 Geo. 3. c. 25 (I)	24 March 1785
An Act for granting the sum of £1,000 to the Hibernian Marine Society, towards supporting the said charity. (Repealed by Statute Law Revision (Ireland) Act 1879 (42 & 43 Vict. c. 24))
First Fruits Board Grant Act 1785 (repealed)	25 Geo. 3. c. 26 (I)	24 March 1785
An Act for granting the sum of £5,000 to the board of first fruits for the purposes therein mentioned. (Repealed by Statute Law Revision (Ireland) Act 1879 (42 & 43 Vict. c. 24))
Dublin Society Grant Act 1785 (repealed)	25 Geo. 3. c. 27 (I)	24 March 1785
An Act for granting the sum of £5,000 to the Dublin Society for the purposes therein mentioned. (Repealed by Statute Law Revision (Ireland) Act 1879 (42 & 43 Vict. c. 24))
Mutiny Act (Ireland) 1785 (repealed)	25 Geo. 3. c. 28 (I)	24 March 1785
An Act for punishing mutiny and desertion, and for the better payment of the army and their quarters. (Repealed by Statute Law Revision (Ireland) Act 1879 (42 & 43 Vict. c. 24))
Foundling Hospital Grant Act 1785 (repealed)	25 Geo. 3. c. 29 (I)	24 March 1785
An Act for granting the sum of £10,000 to the governors of the foundling hospital and workhouse for the purposes therein mentioned. (Repealed by Statute Law Revision (Ireland) Act 1879 (42 & 43 Vict. c. 24))
Royal Exchange Duties Act 1785 (repealed)	25 Geo. 3. c. 30 (I)	24 March 1785
An Act for granting to his majesty the duties therein mentioned to be paid to the trustees of the Royal Exchange. (Repealed by Statute Law Revision (Ireland) Act 1879 (42 & 43 Vict. c. 24))
Jurors Panels Challenge Act 1785 (repealed)	25 Geo. 3. c. 31 (I)	24 March 1785
An Act to take away the Challenge to the Array of Panels of Jurors for Want of a Knight on Trials, in which a Peer or Lord of Parliament is a Party. (Repealed by Juries (Ireland) Act 1833 (3 & 4 Will. 4. c. 91))
Qualification of Persons in Offices Act 1785 (repealed)	25 Geo. 3. c. 32 (I)	24 March 1785
An Act for allowing further time to persons in offices or employments to qualify themselves pursuant to an act entitled "An Act to prevent the further growth of Popery." (Note: Popery Act 1703 (2 Anne c. 6 (I))) (Repealed by Statute Law Revision (Ireland) Act 1879 (42 & 43 Vict. c. 24))
Nenagh Road Act 1785	25 Geo. 3. c. 33 (I)	24 March 1785
An Act to repeal an act passed in the 19th and 20th years of his present majesty (Note: Nenagh to Curranaboy Bridge Road Act 1779 (19 & 20 Geo. 3. c. 47 (I))) entitled "An Act for amending and making more effectual an act (Note: Nenagh to Curranaboy Bridge Road Act 1777 (17 & 18 Geo. 3. c. 39 (I))) for repairing the road leading from the town of Nenagh (Note: Nenagh, County Tipperary.) in the County Tipperary, through the towns of Birr (Note: Birr, County Offaly.) and Firbane (Note: Ferbane, County Offaly.) in the King's County, to Curranaboy Bridge on the turnpike road leading to Athlone (Note: Athlone, County Westmeath.) in the county of Westmeath," and also for other purposes therein mentioned.
Revenue and Frauds Prevention Act 1785 (repealed)	25 Geo. 3. c. 34 (I)	19 July 1785
An Act for continuing and amending several laws relating to his majesty's revenue, and for the more effectually preventing of frauds therein. (Repealed by Statute Law Revision (Ireland) Act 1879 (42 & 43 Vict. c. 24))
Sea Fisheries Act 1785	25 Geo. 3. c. 35 (I)	19 July 1785
An Act for the further Improvement and Extension of the Fisheries on the Coasts of this Kingdom.
Sheriffs Act 1785^{(Republic of Ireland)} or the Sheriffs Act (Ireland) 1785^{(United Kingdom)}	25 Geo. 3. c. 36 (I)	30 June 1785
An Act to amend an Act passed in the Twelfth Year of His late Majesty George the First, entitled, "An Act for better regulating the Office of Sheriffs, and for ascertaining their Fees, and the Fees for suing their Patents, and passing their Accounts;" (Note: Sheriffs Act 1725 (12 Geo. 1. c. 4 (I))) and for extending the Provisions thereof.
Forgery Act 1785 (repealed)	25 Geo. 3. c. 37 (I)	30 June 1785
An Act to explain and amend an act passed in the 13th and 14th years of the reign of his present majesty King George III entitled "An Act for the more effectual preventing the forging or altering the acceptance or endorsements of bills of exchange, or the numbers or principal sums of accountable receipts for notes, bills or other securities for payment of money or warrants, or orders for payment of money, or delivery of goods." (Note: Forgery Act 1773 (13 & 14 Geo. 3. c. 14 (I))) (Repealed by Criminal Statutes Repeal Act 1861 (24 & 25 Vict. c. 95))
Ecclesiastical Persons Qualification Records Act 1785 (repealed)	25 Geo. 3. c. 38 (I)	30 June 1785
An Act to remedy the Inconveniencies which arise to Ecclesiastical Persons, from the Loss of their Titles, and Certificates of their other Qualifications. (Repealed by Statute Law Revision (Ireland) Act 1879 (42 & 43 Vict. c. 24))
Cashel Infirmary Act 1785	25 Geo. 3. c. 39 (I)	30 June 1785
An Act for extending the provisions of an act passed in this kingdom in the 5th year of the reign of his present majesty entitled "An Act for erecting and establishing public infirmaries or hospitals in this kingdom." (Note: County Hospitals Act 1765 (5 Geo. 3. c. 20 (I)))
County Hospitals Act 1785 or the Queen's County Infirmary Act 1785	25 Geo. 3. c. 40 (I)	30 June 1785
An Act for further extending the provisions of an act passed in this kingdom in the 5th year of the reign of his present majesty entitled "An Act for erecting and establishing public infirmaries or hospitals in this kingdom."
Prosperous Markets Act 1785	25 Geo. 3. c. 41 (I)	30 June 1785
An Act for amending an act entitled "An Act for the issuing treasury bills to the amount therein mentioned for the purpose of promoting manufactures by providing for the settlement of a number of industrious manufacturers at Prosperous in the county of Kildare." (Note: Prosperous Markets Act 1783 (23 & 24 Geo. 3. c. 12 (I)))
School of Physic Act 1785	25 Geo. 3. c. 42 (I)	30 June 1785
An Act for establishing a Complete School of Physick in this Kingdom.
Parnell Square Act 1785 or the Rutland Square and Rotunda Hospital Act 1785	25 Geo. 3. c. 43 (I)	19 July 1785
An Act for the completing and effectually lighting and watching of Rutland Square, and for the better Support and Maintenance of the Hospital for the Relief of poor Lying-in Women in the City of Dublin, and for other Purposes therein mentioned.
Manor Courts Small Debts Act 1785 (repealed)	25 Geo. 3. c. 44 (I)	11 August 1785
An Act for the more speedy and easy Recovery of small Debts, in the Manor Courts within this Kingdom, and for regulating the Costs of Proceedings for that Purpose therein. (Repealed by Statute Law Revision (Ireland) Act 1879 (42 & 43 Vict. c. 24))
Lotteries Act 1785 (repealed)	25 Geo. 3. c. 45 (I)	11 August 1785
An Act to amend the laws relative to lotteries in this kingdom. (Repealed by Statute Law Revision (Ireland) Act 1879 (42 & 43 Vict. c. 24))
Insolvent Debtors Relief Act 1785 (repealed)	25 Geo. 3. c. 46 (I)	19 July 1785
An Act for the relief of insolvent debtors with respect to the imprisonment of their persons. (Repealed by Statute Law Revision (Ireland) Act 1879 (42 & 43 Vict. c. 24))
Registration of Deeds Act 1785^{(Republic of Ireland)}	25 Geo. 3. c. 47 (I)	11 August 1785
An Act for amending the several Laws relating to the registering of Wills and Deeds in the Registry Office of this Kingdom, and for the better regulating and conducting the Business of the said Office.
Manufactures Bounties Grant Act 1785 (repealed)	25 Geo. 3. c. 48 (I)	11 August 1785
An Act for granting the sums of £20,000, £5,000 and £4,000 to certain trustees and for promoting the manufactures therein mentioned. (Repealed by Statute Law Revision (Ireland) Act 1879 (42 & 43 Vict. c. 24))
Ecclesiastical Lands Act 1785^{(Republic of Ireland)}	25 Geo. 3. c. 49 (I)	19 July 1785
An Act to explain and amend the several Acts made in this Kingdom, to encourage the building of Houses, and making other Improvements on Church Lands, and for other Purposes.
Dublin Foundling Hospital Act 1785	25 Geo. 3. c. 50 (I)	19 July 1785
An Act for the better Support and Maintenance of the Foundling Hospital.
Vexatious Injunctions and Costs Act 1785 (repealed)	25 Geo. 3. c. 51 (I)	19 July 1785
An Act for preventing vexatious injunctions to stay proceedings at law, and for giving costs to defendants in courts of equity in certain cases. (Repealed by Statute Law Revision (Ireland) Act 1879 (42 & 43 Vict. c. 24))
Freeholders Registration Act 1785	25 Geo. 3. c. 52 (I)	11 August 1785
An Act for the more effectually registering freeholders.
State Debts Act 1785^{(Republic of Ireland)}	25 Geo. 3. c. 53 (I)	11 August 1785
An Act to amend an Act, entitled, "An Act for the more speedy and effectual Recovery of the King's Debts." (Note: State Debts Act 1781 (21 & 22 Geo. 3. c. 20 (I)))
Expiring Statutes Continuance Act 1785 (repealed)	25 Geo. 3. c. 54 (I)	11 August 1785
An Act for reviving, continuing and amending several temporary statutes. (Repealed by Statute Law Revision (Ireland) Act 1879 (42 & 43 Vict. c. 24))
Leases by Schools Act 1785^{(Republic of Ireland)}	25 Geo. 3. c. 55 (I)	11 August 1785
An Act to alter and amend an Act made in the Twenty-first and Twenty-second Years of his present Majesty’s Reign, entitled, "An Act to enable the Governors of any of the Schools founded in this Kingdom, to make long Leases of such Lands as have been granted for the Support of the said Schools, and are situate in Counties of Cities, and Counties of Towns." (Note: Leases by Schools Act 1781 (21 & 22 Geo. 3. c. 27 (I)))
Circular Road Act 1785	25 Geo. 3. c. 56 (I)	30 June 1785
An Act to amend an act made in the 17th and 18th years of the reign of his present majesty entitled "An Act for making and keeping in repair a circular road round the city of Dublin." (Note: Circular Road Act 1777 (17 & 18 Geo. 3. c. 10 (I)))
Hay Exportation Act 1785 (repealed)	25 Geo. 3. c. 57 (I)	7 September 1785
An Act to prevent the exportation of hay from this kingdom for a limited time. (Repealed by Statute Law Revision (Ireland) Act 1879 (42 & 43 Vict. c. 24))
Parish Clerks Maintenance Act 1785	25 Geo. 3. c. 58 (I)	7 September 1785
An Act for the better carrying into execution the several laws for providing a maintenance for parish clerks, and for other purposes.
Justices of the Peace Qualification Act 1785 (repealed)	25 Geo. 3. c. 59 (I)	7 September 1785
An Act to explain and amend an act passed in the 23rd and 24th years of his present majesty entitled "An Act for ascertaining the qualification of such persons as shall take out commissions of the peace for counties at large." (Note: Justices of the Peace Qualification Act 1783 (23 & 24 Geo. 3. c. 30 (I))) (Repealed by Statute Law Revision (Ireland) Act 1879 (42 & 43 Vict. c. 24))
Corn Measures Act 1785 (repealed)	25 Geo. 3. c. 60 (I)	7 September 1785
An Act to repeal an act entitled "An Act for regulating measures in buying and selling corn, and for promoting husbandry." (Note: Corn Measures and Husbandry Act 1727 (1 Geo. 2. c. 10 (I))) (Repealed by Statute Law Revision (Ireland) Act 1879 (42 & 43 Vict. c. 24))
Dublin Society Grant Act 1785 (repealed)	25 Geo. 3. c. 61 (I)	7 September 1785
An Act for directing the application of £2,500 granted to the Dublin Society for the encouragement of manufactures, arts and sciences. (Repealed by Statute Law Revision (Ireland) Act 1879 (42 & 43 Vict. c. 24))
Leases for Corn Mills Act 1785^{(Republic of Ireland)}	25 Geo. 3. c. 62 (I)	7 September 1785
An Act to explain and amend several Laws now in Force for the Encouragement of Agriculture.
Public Money Accounting Act 1785	25 Geo. 3. c. 63 (I)	7 September 1785
To carry into further effect an act passed in the last session of parliament in this kingdom entitled "An Act for the due accounting for all money granted for public works, charities and hospitals, and for the ordering a regular account in future of all monies entrusted to the corporation for carrying on the inland navigation, the trustees of the linen manufacture, the Dublin Society, the paymaster of the corn premiums, the corporation for paving the streets of Dublin, and for other purposes therein mentioned." (Note: Public Money Accounting Act 1783 (23 & 24 Geo. 3. c. 26 (I)))
Port and Ballast Office of Belfast Act 1785	25 Geo. 3. c. 64 (I)	7 September 1785
An Act to amend an act entitled "An Act for cleansing the ports, harbours and rivers of the city of Cork, and of the towns of Galway, Sligo, Drogheda and Belfast, and for erecting a ballast office in the said city, and each of the said towns." (Note: Ballast Offices Act 1729 (3 Geo. 2. c. 21 (I)))
Conyngham's Estate Act 1785	25 Geo. 3. c. 65 (I)	11 August 1785
An Act for raising the Sum of Twenty Thousand Pounds upon the Manors of Port Dungloe and Mount Charles, in the County of Donegal, the Estate of the Right Honourable William Conyngham, to be expended together with another Sum of Twenty Thousand Pounds granted by Parliament, in promoting the Fisheries on the Western Coast of the County of Donegal, in Manner therein mentioned.

=== Private acts ===
Short title, or popular name	Citation	Royal assent
Long title
Usher's Estate Act 1785	25 Geo. 3. c. 1 Pr. (I)	
An act for vesting certain lands, tenements, hereditaments and premises, situate in the county of Waterford and kingdom of Ireland, the estate of John Usher, Esq; in trustees, that the same, or a competent part thereof, may be sold for the payment of debts and incumbrances affecting the same.
Burke's Estate Act 1785	25 Geo. 3. c. 2 Pr. (I)	19 July 1785
An Act for vesting certain lands in the county of Galway, late the estate of Sir Ulick Burke, baronet, deceased, in trustees to raise by sale or mortgage of a competent part thereof a sum of £16,000 sterling, for the purpose of paying off encumbrances, and for other family purposes therein mentioned.
Taylor's Estate Act 1785	25 Geo. 3. c. 3 Pr. (I)	19 July 1785
An Act for vesting certain lands therein mentioned, the estates of Walter Taylor of Castle Taylor in the county of Galway, esquire, in trustees for payments of debts and encumbrances affecting the same.
Tilson's Estate Act 1785	25 Geo. 3. c. 4 Pr. (I)	19 July 1785
An Act for making an exemplification of the last will and testament of James Tilson, formerly of Bolesworth Castle in the county of Chester in the kingdom of Great Britain, esquire, evidence of such will within the kingdom of Ireland.
Lord Doneraile's Estate Act 1785	25 Geo. 3. c. 5 Pr. (I)	19 July 1785
An Act to enable the Right Honourable St Leger, Lord Baron Doneraile, and his eldest son, the Honourable Hayes St Leger, to settle a jointure on such wife as the said Hayes should marry in the lifetime of his said father, and to secure a provision for the younger children of the said Hayes St Leger by such wife.
Viscount Bangor's Estate Act 1785	25 Geo. 3. c. 6 Pr. (I)	19 July 1785
An Act to enable the Honourable Edward Ward and Sir John Parnell, baronet, committees of the estates of the Right Honourable Nicholas, Lord Viscount Bangor, a lunatic, to make leases of the estates of the said lunatic.
Earl of Arran's Estate Act 1785	25 Geo. 3. c. 7 Pr. (I)	11 August 1785
An Act for the more effectually raising a sufficient sum of money for discharging the debts and encumbrances affecting certain lands in the counties of Wexford, Mayo, Sligo and Donegal, the estates of the Right Honourable Arthur Saunders, earl of Arran, and the Honourable Arthur Saunders Gore, commonly called Lord Viscount Sudley, and for the payment of the debts now due by them respectively, and for other purposes.
Cromie's Estate Act 1785	25 Geo. 3. c. 8 Pr. (I)	11 August 1785
An Act for vesting in trustees certain lands in the counties of Kildare and Mayo, part of the estates of Sir Michael Cromie, baronet, for raising a sum of £13,000 to discharge encumbrances affecting said estate.
Earl of Glandore's Estate Act 1785	25 Geo. 3. c. 9 Pr. (I)	7 September 1785
An Act for vesting certain lands and premises therein mentioned, the estate of the Right Honourable John, earl of Glandore, in trustees, for raising a sum not exceeding £6,500 by demise, sale or mortgage of a competent part thereof, for the purposes in the said act mentioned, and to enable the said earl of Glandore to make building leases of part thereof.
Pleydell's Estate Act 1785	25 Geo. 3. c. 10 Pr. (I)	7 September 1785
An Act to enable Jonathan Morton Pleydell of Teignmouth in the county of Devon in the kingdom of Great Britain, esquire, during his life and after his decease to empower Jonathan Morton Pleydell, his son, and the daughters of the said Jonathan Morton Pleydell, the elder, when they shall respectively be in possession of his the said Jonathan Morton Pleydell the elder's estate in the counties of Cavan and Meath in the kingdom of Ireland, to make leases of said lands, and for other purposes therein mentioned.

=== Sources ===
- "Acts of Parliament by Session: 1785". Irish Legislation Database. Queen's University Belfast.
- "Pre-Union Irish Statutes: 1785 Acts". Irish Statute Book. Attorney General of Ireland.

== 26 Geo. 3 (1786) ==
The 3rd session of the 4th parliament of George III, which met from 19 January 1786 to 8 May 1786.

This session was also traditionally cited as 26 G. 3.

=== Public acts ===
Short title, or popular name	Citation	Royal assent
Long title
Wines, Hides, Beer, and Import Duties Act 1786 (repealed)	26 Geo. 3. c. 1 (I)	21 March 1786
An Act for granting unto his majesty, his heirs and successors an additional duty on wine, hides, beer, ale and other goods and merchandises therein mentioned, and for prohibiting the importation of all gold and silver lace, and of all cambrics and lawns, except of the manufacture of Great Britain, and of all hops, except of the growth of Great Britain and British plantations, and of all glass, except from Great Britain. (Repealed by Statute Law Revision (Ireland) Act 1879 (42 & 43 Vict. c. 24))
Aids, Duties, Rates, and Taxes Act 1786 (repealed)	26 Geo. 3. c. 2 (I)	21 March 1786
An Act for granting to his majesty the several duties, rates, impositions and taxes therein particularly expressed to be applied to the payment of the interest of the sums therein provided for, and towards the discharge of the said principal sums in such manner as therein is directed, and for such other purposes as are therein mentioned. (Repealed by Statute Law Revision (Ireland) Act 1879 (42 & 43 Vict. c. 24))
Malt Duties Act 1786 (repealed)	26 Geo. 3. c. 3 (I)	21 March 1786
An Act for granting unto his majesty, his heirs and successors certain duties upon malt. (Repealed by Statute Law Revision (Ireland) Act 1879 (42 & 43 Vict. c. 24))
Linen and Hempen Manufactures (Flax Seed) Act 1786 (repealed)	26 Geo. 3. c. 4 (I)	21 March 1786
An Act to promote the linen and hempen manufactures by increasing the supply of Irish flax seed, and encouraging the export of linens and sail cloth, and for granting to his majesty, his heirs and successors the duties therein mentioned. (Repealed by Statute Law Revision (Ireland) Act 1879 (42 & 43 Vict. c. 24))
Sugar Trade Regulation Act 1786 (repealed)	26 Geo. 3. c. 5 (I)	21 March 1786
An Act for regulating the sugar trade, and for granting to his majesty, his heirs and successors the several duties therein mentioned. (Repealed by Statute Law Revision (Ireland) Act 1879 (42 & 43 Vict. c. 24))
Tobacco Trade Regulation Act 1786 (repealed)	26 Geo. 3. c. 6 (I)	21 March 1786
An Act for regulating and extending the tobacco trade, and for granting unto his majesty, his heirs and successors the duties therein mentioned. (Repealed by Statute Law Revision (Ireland) Act 1879 (42 & 43 Vict. c. 24))
Coffee Duties Act 1786 (repealed)	26 Geo. 3. c. 7 (I)	21 March 1786
An Act for granting unto his majesty, his heirs and successors the several duties therein mentioned upon coffee. (Repealed by Statute Law Revision (Ireland) Act 1879 (42 & 43 Vict. c. 24))
Carriage Duties Act 1786 (repealed)	26 Geo. 3. c. 8 (I)	21 March 1786
An Act for granting unto his majesty, his heirs and successors certain duties on carriages. (Repealed by Statute Law Revision (Ireland) Act 1879 (42 & 43 Vict. c. 24))
Advancement of Trade Act 1786 (repealed)	26 Geo. 3. c. 9 (I)	21 March 1786
An Act for the advancement of trade, and for granting to his majesty, his heirs and successors the several duties therein mentioned. (Repealed by Statute Law Revision (Ireland) Act 1879 (42 & 43 Vict. c. 24))
Licences Duties Act 1786 (repealed)	26 Geo. 3. c. 10 (I)	21 March 1786
An Act for granting certain duties upon licences to be taken out by the several persons therein mentioned. (Repealed by Statute Law Revision (Ireland) Act 1879 (42 & 43 Vict. c. 24))
Royal Exchange Duties Act 1786 (repealed)	26 Geo. 3. c. 11 (I)	25 March 1786
An Act for granting to his majesty the duties therein mentioned to be paid to the trustees of the Royal Exchange. (Repealed by Statute Law Revision (Ireland) Act 1879 (42 & 43 Vict. c. 24))
Postage and Conveyance of Letters Act 1786 (repealed)	26 Geo. 3. c. 12 (I)	21 March 1786
An Act for granting to his majesty, his heirs and successors certain rates and duties upon the portage and conveyance of all letters and packets within this kingdom, and for the purposes therein mentioned. (Repealed by Statute Law Revision (Ireland) Act 1879 (42 & 43 Vict. c. 24))
Hawkers and Pedlars Licensing Act 1786 (repealed)	26 Geo. 3. c. 13 (I)	21 March 1786
An Act for licensing hawkers and pedlars, petty chapmen and other persons. (Repealed by Statute Law Revision (Ireland) Act 1879 (42 & 43 Vict. c. 24))
County Dublin Roads Act 1786 or Dublin County Roads Act 1786	26 Geo. 3. c. 14 (I)	21 March 1786
An Act for making widening and repairing publick Roads in the County of Dublin and for repealing Parts of several Acts formerly made for that Purpose.
Stamp Duties Act 1786 (repealed)	26 Geo. 3. c. 15 (I)	16 March 1786
An Act for granting unto his majesty, his heirs and successors several duties therein mentioned to be levied by the commissioners for managing the stamp duties. (Repealed by Statute Law Revision (Ireland) Act 1879 (42 & 43 Vict. c. 24))
Trade with United States Act 1786 (repealed)	26 Geo. 3. c. 16 (I)	25 March 1786
An Act for facilitating the Trade and Intercourse between this Kingdom and the United States of America. (Repealed by Statute Law Revision (Ireland) Act 1879 (42 & 43 Vict. c. 24))
Inland Bills of Exchange and Promissory Notes Act 1786 (repealed)	26 Geo. 3. c. 17 (I)	21 March 1786
An Act to explain and amend an Act passed in this Kingdom in the eighth Year of the Reign of Her late Majesty Queen Anne, entitled, "An act for the better Payment of Inland Bills of Exchange, and making Promissory Notes more obligatory." (Note: Inland Bills of Exchange and Promissory Notes Act 1709 (8 Anne c. 11 (I))) (Repealed by Bills of Exchange (Ireland) Act 1828 (9 Geo. 4. c. 24))
Mutiny Act (Ireland) 1786 (repealed)	26 Geo. 3. c. 18 (I)	25 March 1786
An Act for punishing mutiny and desertion, and for the better payment of the army and their quarters within this kingdom. (Repealed by Statute Law Revision (Ireland) Act 1879 (42 & 43 Vict. c. 24))
Dublin Port Act 1786^{(Republic of Ireland)}	26 Geo. 3. c. 19 (I)	8 May 1786
An Act for Promoting the Trade of Dublin, by rendering its Port and Harbour more commodious.
Sea Fisheries Act 1786 (repealed)	26 Geo. 3. c. 20 (I)	8 May 1786
An Act to explain and amend an Act passed in the Twenty-fifth Year of His present Majesty, entitled, "An Act for the further Improvement and Extension of the Fisheries on the Coasts of this Kingdom." (Note: Sea Fisheries Act 1785 (25 Geo. 3. c. 35 (I))) (Repealed by Fisheries (Ireland) Act 1842 (5 & 6 Vict. c. 106))
Revenue and Frauds Prevention Act 1786 (repealed)	26 Geo. 3. c. 21 (I)	8 May 1786
An Act for continuing and amending several Laws relating to His Majesty's Revenue, and for the more effectually preventing of Frauds therein, and for other purposes therein mentioned. (Repealed by Statute Law Revision (Ireland) Act 1879 (42 & 43 Vict. c. 24))
Freeholders Registration Suspension Act 1786	26 Geo. 3. c. 22 (I)	8 May 1786
An Act to suspend for a limited time the operation of an act passed last session of parliament entitled "An Act for the more effectually registering of freeholders," (Note: Freeholders Registration Act 1785 (25 Geo. 3. c. 52 (I))) so far as the same shall affect the election of members to serve in parliament.
Freeholders Registration Act 1786	26 Geo. 3. c. 23 (I)	8 May 1786
An Act for amending the several laws relative to the registering of freeholders.
Forcible Entry Act 1786^{(Republic of Ireland)}	26 Geo. 3. c. 24 (I)	8 May 1786
An Act for the better Execution of the Law within the City of Dublin, and certain Parts adjacent thereto; and for quieting and protecting Possessions within this Kingdom; for the more expeditious Transportation of Felons; for reviving, continuing, and amending certain Statutes therein mentioned; and for repealing an Act passed in the Seventeenth and Eighteenth Years of the Reign of His present Majesty, entitled, "An Act for improving the Police of the City of Dublin." (Note: Dublin Police Act 1777 (17 & 18 Geo. 3. c. 43 (I)))
Fisheries, Trade and Manufactures Grant Act 1786 (repealed)	26 Geo. 3. c. 25 (I)	8 May 1786
An Act for applying £10,000 being part of £71,600 granted this session of parliament for the advancement of fisheries, trade and manufactures. (Repealed by Statute Law Revision (Ireland) Act 1879 (42 & 43 Vict. c. 24))
Uncertificated Bankrupts Relief Act 1786	26 Geo. 3. c. 26 (I)	8 May 1786
An Act for the relief of uncertificated bankrupts.
Prisons Regulation Act 1786 (repealed)	26 Geo. 3. c. 27 (I)	8 May 1786
An Act for amending and carrying more effectually into Force the several Laws now in being for regulating the Publick Gaols and Prisons throughout this Kingdom. (Repealed by Prisons (Ireland) Act 1810 (50 Geo. 3. c. 103))
City of Cork Act 1786^{(Republic of Ireland)} or the Cork Improvement Act 1786	26 Geo. 3. c. 28 (I)	8 May 1786
An Act for Building a Bridge over the Northern Channel of the River Lee, in the City of Cork, and Suburbs thereof, and for other Purposes relative to the said City.
Linen Manufacture Trustees Grant Act 1786	26 Geo. 3. c. 29 (I)	8 May 1786
An Act for granting the Sum of Four Thousand Pounds to the Trustees of the Linen Manufacture, and for the Purposes therein mentioned.
Dublin to Malahide Road Act 1786	26 Geo. 3. c. 30 (I)	8 May 1786
An Act for making widening and repairing the Road leading from the City of Dublin to Malahide, and for erecting Turnpike Gates, and receiving Tolls thereout, in Aid of the Barony Presentments, and for appointing Trustees for carrying the said Purposes into Execution.
Writ of Scire Facias Act 1786 (repealed)	26 Geo. 3. c. 31 (I)	8 May 1786
An Act for making more effectual an Act made in the Seventeenth Year of the Reign of His late Majesty King Charles the Second, Entitled, "An Act to prevent Delays in extending Statutes, Judgments, and Recognizances," (Note: Judgments and Recognizances Act 1665 (17 & 18 Chas. 2. c. 11 (I))) and for explaining an Act made in the Tenth Year of the Reign of His late Majesty King Charles the First, Entitled, "An Act for Contentation of Debts upon Execution." (Note: Debts upon Execution Act 1634 (10 Chas. 1 Sess. 3. c. 7 (I))) (Repealed for the Republic of Ireland by Statute Law Revision (Pre-Union Irish Statutes) Act 1962 (No. 29) and for Northern Ireland by the Statute Law Revision Act 1950 (14 Geo. 6. c. 6))
Dublin Improvement Act 1786	26 Geo. 3. c. 32 (I)	8 May 1786
An Act for explaining and further amending the several Acts heretofore passed for the Improvement of the City of Dublin, by making wide and convenient Passages through the same, and for other Purposes.
Game Act 1786	26 Geo. 3. c. 33 (I)	8 May 1786
An Act to amend an act passed in 3rd year of his present majesty entitled "An act for the preservation of the game." (Note: Game Act 1763 (3 Geo. 3. c. 23 (I)))
Partnerships in Trade Act 1786 (repealed)	26 Geo. 3. c. 34 (I)	8 May 1786
An Act for the more effectually promoting Partnerships in Trade, by amending the Laws respecting the same. (Repealed by Statute Law Revision (Ireland) Act 1879 (42 & 43 Vict. c. 24))
Lime Measurement Act 1786 (repealed)	26 Geo. 3. c. 35 (I)	8 May 1786
An Act to explain and amend an Act passed in the Thirteenth and Fourteenth Years of His present Majesty, entitled, "An Act for the preventing Frauds in the Measurement of Lime." (Note: Lime Measurement Act 1773 (13 & 14 Geo. 3. c. 37 (I))) (Repealed by Statute Law Revision (Ireland) Act 1879 (42 & 43 Vict. c. 24))
John Kyan's Smelting House Act 1786	26 Geo. 3. c. 36 (I)	8 May 1786
An Act for rendering effectual a Grant made formerly by Parliament, for the Encouragement of the Copper Manufacture of this Kingdom.
False Pretences and Threats Punishment Act 1786 (repealed)	26 Geo. 3. c. 37 (I)	8 May 1786
An Act for the more effectual punishment of persons who shall attain or attempt to attain possession of money or goods by false pretences or by threats. (Repealed by Criminal Statutes (Ireland) Repeal Act 1828 (9 Geo. 4. c. 53))
Inland Navigation Act 1786	26 Geo. 3. c. 38 (I)	8 May 1786
An Act for continuing the encouragement given by former acts of parliament for promoting and carrying on inland navigations in this kingdom.
Light Gold Coin Prevention Act 1786 (repealed)	26 Geo. 3. c. 39 (I)	8 May 1786
An Act to prevent the Practice of fraudulently buying and selling of Light Gold Coin in this Kingdom. (Repealed by Coinage Offences Act 1832 (2 & 3 Will. 4. c. 34))
Dublin City Public Money and Roads Act 1786	26 Geo. 3. c. 40 (I)	8 May 1786
An Act for the more effectually collecting the public money to be raised by presentment within the county of the city of Dublin, and also for the more effectually repairing the roads within the county of the said city and the liberties thereof.
Dublin to Mullingar Road Act 1786	26 Geo. 3. c. 41 (I)	8 May 1786
An Act for continuing and amending the several laws relating to the turnpike road leading from Dublin to Mullingar, and for more effectually enabling the trustees thereof to widen the narrow parts leading from Chapelizod to Dublin on the north and south sides of the River Liffey.
Prosperous Markets Act 1786 or the Estate of Robert Brooke Act 1786	26 Geo. 3. c. 42 (I)	8 May 1786
An Act for further promoting the Purposes of an Act, entitled, "An Act for the issuing Treasury Bills to the Amount therein mentioned, for the Purpose of promoting Manufactures, by providing for the Settlement of a Number of industrious Manufacturers at Prosperous in the County of Kildare." (Note: Prosperous Markets Act 1783 (23 & 24 Geo. 3. c. 12 (I)))
Pawnbrokers Act 1786^{(Republic of Ireland)}	26 Geo. 3. c. 43 (I)	8 May 1786
An Act to establish the Business of a Pawnbroker, and to authorize such Persons as shall be duly qualified to carry on the same, to lend Money on Pawns or Pledges, and to receive Interest at a higher Rate than heretofore was recoverable by Law.
Unqualified Persons Relief Act 1786 (repealed)	26 Geo. 3. c. 44 (I)	8 May 1786
An Act for the relief of persons who have omitted to qualify themselves according to law. (Repealed by Statute Law Revision (Ireland) Act 1879 (42 & 43 Vict. c. 24))
Grand Jury Gaols Act 1786 (repealed)	26 Geo. 3. c. 45 (I)	8 May 1786
An Act to enable the Grand Juries of the several Counties, Counties of Cities, and Counties of Towns within this Kingdom, to grant such Sums as shall be necessary for building and repairing Bridewells therein. (Repealed by Statute Law Revision (Ireland) Act 1879 (42 & 43 Vict. c. 24))
Manufactures Bounties Grant Act 1786 (repealed)	26 Geo. 3. c. 46 (I)	8 May 1786
An Act for granting the sum of £20,000 to certain trustees for distributing bounties and promoting the several manufactures therein named. (Repealed by Statute Law Revision (Ireland) Act 1879 (42 & 43 Vict. c. 24))
Protestant Charter Schools Grant Act 1786 (repealed)	26 Geo. 3. c. 47 (I)	8 May 1786
An Act for granting the sum of £9,000 to the Incorporated Society for Supporting the Protestant Charter Schools of this Kingdom. (Repealed by Statute Law Revision (Ireland) Act 1879 (42 & 43 Vict. c. 24))
Dublin Society Grant Act 1786 (repealed)	26 Geo. 3. c. 48 (I)	8 May 1786
An Act for granting the Sum of Five thousand Pounds to the Dublin Society for the Purposes therein mentioned. (Repealed by Statute Law Revision (Ireland) Act 1879 (42 & 43 Vict. c. 24))
Lord Chancellor and Chief Judges Grant Act 1786 (repealed)	26 Geo. 3. c. 49 (I)	8 May 1786
An Act for granting the sum of £3,000 to the lord chancellor and chief judges for the purposes therein mentioned. (Repealed by Statute Law Revision (Ireland) Act 1879 (42 & 43 Vict. c. 24))
Inland Fisheries Act 1786 (repealed)	26 Geo. 3. c. 50 (I)	8 May 1786
An Act to explain and amend an Act passed in the Twenty-third and Twenty-fourth Years of His present Majesty, entitled, "An Act for the Protection and Improvement of the Inland Fisheries of this Kingdom." (Note: Inland Fisheries Act 1783 (23 & 24 Geo. 3. c. 40 (I))) (Repealed by Fisheries (Ireland) Act 1842 (5 & 6 Vict. c. 106))
Dublin Foundling Hospital Grant Act 1786 (repealed)	26 Geo. 3. c. 51 (I)	8 May 1786
An Act for granting the Sum of Five thousand Pounds to the Governors of the Foundling Hospital and Workhouse for the Purposes therein mentioned. (Repealed by Statute Law Revision (Ireland) Act 1879 (42 & 43 Vict. c. 24))
Dublin Poor Relief Grant Act 1786 (repealed)	26 Geo. 3. c. 52 (I)	8 May 1786
An Act for granting the Sum of Eight thousand six hundred Pounds to the Corporation for the Relief of the Poor of the City of Dublin. (Repealed by Statute Law Revision (Ireland) Act 1879 (42 & 43 Vict. c. 24))
First Fruits Board Grant Act 1786 (repealed)	26 Geo. 3. c. 53 (I)	8 May 1786
An Act for granting the sum of £5,000 to the board of first fruits for the purposes therein mentioned. (Repealed by Statute Law Revision (Ireland) Act 1879 (42 & 43 Vict. c. 24))
Hibernian School Grant Act 1786 (repealed)	26 Geo. 3. c. 54 (I)	8 May 1786
An Act for granting the sum of £1,000 to the governors of the Hibernian School, for the support of that charity. (Repealed by Statute Law Revision (Ireland) Act 1879 (42 & 43 Vict. c. 24))
Hibernian Marine Society Grant Act 1786 (repealed)	26 Geo. 3. c. 55 (I)	8 May 1786
An Act for granting the sum of £1,000 to the Hibernian Marine Society, towards supporting the said charity. (Repealed by Statute Law Revision (Ireland) Act 1879 (42 & 43 Vict. c. 24))
Navigation House Act 1786	26 Geo. 3. c. 56 (I)	8 May 1786
An Act for vesting the House, commonly called the Navigation-House, in the City of Dublin, with all the Furniture therein (not being private Property) in His Majesty, His Heirs and Successors.
Dublin Theatres Act 1786^{(Republic of Ireland)}	26 Geo. 3. c. 57 (I)	8 May 1786
An Act for regulating the Stage in the City and County of Dublin.
Waterford Bridge Act 1786	26 Geo. 3. c. 58 (I)	8 May 1786
An Act for building a Bridge over the River Suir at Waterford.
Limerick Gaol Act 1786	26 Geo. 3. c. 59 (I)	8 May 1786
An Act to amend an act passed in the 23rd and 24th years of his present majesty entitled "An Act for the erecting and building a new and convenient gaol and marshalsea in the city of Limerick, and to enable certain trustees and commissioners therein named to purchase ground whereon to erect and build the same," (Note: Limerick Gaol Act 1783 (23 & 24 Geo. 3. c. 44 (I))) and for enabling the Honourable and Reverend Maurice Crosbie, dean of Limerick, whereof he is seised in right of his deanery, and to purchase a house and offices in the said city for a deanery house as in manner therein set forth.
Naas Canal Act 1786	26 Geo. 3. c. 60 (I)	8 May 1786
An Act to enable certain Persons to make a Navigable Canal from the Grand Canal at Osborstown towards Naas, and into the adjacent Country.
Dublin Improvement Act 1786	26 Geo. 3. c. 61 (I)	8 May 1786
An Act for the Improvement of the City of Dublin, and the Environs thereof, by the better Paving, Lighting, and Cleansing the same.

=== Private acts ===
Short title, or popular name	Citation	Royal assent
Long title
Cox's Name Act 1786	26 Geo. 3. c. 1 Pr. (I)	8 May 1786
An Act to enable Henry Hamilton, esquire, of Dunmanway in the county of Cork, to take upon him the surname of Cox instead of that of Hamilton, and to continue the said surname of Cox to all his descendants, pursuant to the will of Sir Richard Cox, baronet, deceased, and to oblige him and them to bear and use the arms of the said Sir Richard Cox instead of those belonging to the Hamiltons.
Ryves' Estate Act 1786	26 Geo. 3. c. 2 Pr. (I)	8 May 1786
An Act to enable Francis Ryves, esquire, and William Ryves, esquire, his son, to settle a jointure on such wife as the said William Ryves shall marry in the lifetime of the said Francis, his father, and to provide for younger children.
Bonnell's Estate Act 1786	26 Geo. 3. c. 3 Pr. (I)	28 May 1786
An Act for vesting the residue of the real and personal estates of Jane Bonnell, otherwise Conyngham, widow, deceased, in trustees for the purposes mentioned in her will and codicil.

=== Sources ===
- "Acts of Parliament by Session: 1786". Irish Legislation Database. Queen's University Belfast.
- "Pre-Union Irish Statutes: 1786 Acts". Irish Statute Book. Attorney General of Ireland.

== 27 Geo. 3 (1787) ==
The 4th session of the 4th parliament of George III, which met from 18 January 1787 to 28 May 1787.

This session was also traditionally cited as 27 G. 3.

=== Public acts ===
Short title, or popular name	Citation	Royal assent
Long title
Wines, Hides, Beer, and Import Duties Act 1787 (repealed)	27 Geo. 3. c. 1 (I)	16 March 1787
An Act for granting unto his majesty, his heirs and successors an additional duty on wines, hides, beer, ale and other goods and merchandises therein mentioned, and for prohibiting the importation of all gold and silver lace, and of all cambrics, lawns and glass, except the manufacture of Great Britain and France and the French dominions in Europe, and of all hops, except of the growth of Great Britain and the British plantations. (Repealed by Statute Law Revision (Ireland) Act 1879 (42 & 43 Vict. c. 24))
Aids, Duties, Rates, Impositions and Taxes Act 1787 (repealed)	27 Geo. 3. c. 2 (I)	16 March 1787
An Act for granting to his majesty the several aids, duties, rates, impositions and taxes therein particularly expressed to be applied to the payment of the interest of the sums therein provided for, and towards the discharge of the said principal sums in such manner as therein is directed, and for such other purposes as are therein mentioned. (Repealed by Statute Law Revision (Ireland) Act 1879 (42 & 43 Vict. c. 24))
Malt Duties Act 1787 (repealed)	27 Geo. 3. c. 3 (I)	16 March 1787
An Act for granting unto his majesty, his heirs and successors certain duties upon malt. (Repealed by Statute Law Revision (Ireland) Act 1879 (42 & 43 Vict. c. 24))
Linen and Hempen Manufactures (Flax Seed) Act 1787 (repealed)	27 Geo. 3. c. 4 (I)	16 March 1787
An Act to promote the linen and hempen manufactures by increasing the supply of Irish flax seed, and encouraging the export of linens and sail cloth, and for granting to his majesty, his heirs and successors the duties therein mentioned. (Repealed by Statute Law Revision (Ireland) Act 1879 (42 & 43 Vict. c. 24))
Tobacco Trade Regulation Act 1787 (repealed)	27 Geo. 3. c. 5 (I)	26 March 1787
An Act for regulating and extending the tobacco trade, and for granting unto his majesty, his heirs and successors the duties therein mentioned. (Repealed by Statute Law Revision (Ireland) Act 1879 (42 & 43 Vict. c. 24))
Advancement of Trade Act 1787 (repealed)	27 Geo. 3. c. 6 (I)	26 March 1787
An Act for the advancement of trade, and for granting to his majesty, his heirs and successors the several duties therein mentioned. (Repealed by Statute Law Revision (Ireland) Act 1879 (42 & 43 Vict. c. 24))
Sugar Trade Regulation Act 1787 (repealed)	27 Geo. 3. c. 7 (I)	16 March 1787
An Act for regulating the sugar trade, and for granting to his majesty, his heirs and successors the duties therein mentioned. (Repealed by Statute Law Revision (Ireland) Act 1879 (42 & 43 Vict. c. 24))
Coffee Duties Act 1787 (repealed)	27 Geo. 3. c. 8 (I)	16 March 1787
An Act for granting unto his majesty, his heirs and successors the several duties therein mentioned upon coffee. (Repealed by Statute Law Revision (Ireland) Act 1879 (42 & 43 Vict. c. 24))
Treaty of Commerce and Navigation Act 1787 (repealed)	27 Geo. 3. c. 9 (I)	10 April 1787
An Act for granting certain aids, duties and impositions to his majesty, his heirs and successors for the time therein mentioned, and for giving effect to a treaty of commerce and navigation concluded between his majesty and the most Christian king. (Note: 'Most Christian King' is a reference to the King of France.) (Repealed by Statute Law Revision (Ireland) Act 1879 (42 & 43 Vict. c. 24))
Stamp Duties Act 1787 (repealed)	27 Geo. 3. c. 10 (I)	16 March 1787
An Act for granting unto his majesty, his heirs and successors several duties therein mentioned to be levied by the commissioners for managing the stamp duties. (Repealed by Statute Law Revision (Ireland) Act 1879 (42 & 43 Vict. c. 24))
Postage and Conveyance of Letters Act 1787 (repealed)	27 Geo. 3. c. 11 (I)	16 March 1787
An Act for granting to his majesty, his heirs and successors certain rates and duties upon the portage and conveyance of all letters and packets within this kingdom, and for the purposes therein mentioned. (Repealed by Statute Law Revision (Ireland) Act 1879 (42 & 43 Vict. c. 24))
Hawkers and Pedlars Licensing Act 1787 (repealed)	27 Geo. 3. c. 12 (I)	10 May 1787
An Act for licensing hawkers and pedlars, petty chapmen and other persons. (Repealed by Statute Law Revision (Ireland) Act 1879 (42 & 43 Vict. c. 24))
Manufactures Bounties Grant Act 1787 (repealed)	27 Geo. 3. c. 13 (I)	10 April 1787
An Act for granting the sum of £17,000 to certain trustees for distributing bounties and promoting the several manufactures therein named. (Repealed by Statute Law Revision (Ireland) Act 1879 (42 & 43 Vict. c. 24))
Carriages Duties Act 1787 (repealed)	27 Geo. 3. c. 14 (I)	16 March 1787
An Act for granting unto his majesty, his heirs and successors certain duties on carriages. (Repealed by Statute Law Revision (Ireland) Act 1879 (42 & 43 Vict. c. 24))
Riot Act 1787^{(Republic of Ireland)}	27 Geo. 3. c. 15 (I)	26 March 1787
An Act to prevent tumultuous Risings and Assemblies, and for the more effectual Punishment of Persons guilty of Outrage, Riot, and illegal Combination, and of administering and taking unlawful Oaths.
Mutiny Act (Ireland) 1787 (repealed)	27 Geo. 3. c. 16 (I)	26 March 1787
An Act for punishing mutiny and desertion, and for the better payment of the army and their quarters within this kingdom. (Repealed by Statute Law Revision (Ireland) Act 1879 (42 & 43 Vict. c. 24))
Licences Duties Act 1787 (repealed)	27 Geo. 3. c. 17 (I)	16 March 1787
An Act for granting certain duties upon licences to be taken out by the several persons therein mentioned. (Repealed by Statute Law Revision (Ireland) Act 1879 (42 & 43 Vict. c. 24))
Linen Manufacture Trustees Grant Act 1787 (repealed)	27 Geo. 3. c. 18 (I)	26 March 1787
An Act for granting the sum of £4,000 to the trustees of the linen manufacture for the purposes therein mentioned. (Repealed by Statute Law Revision (Ireland) Act 1879 (42 & 43 Vict. c. 24))
Lord Chancellor and Chief Judges Grant Act 1787 (repealed)	27 Geo. 3. c. 19 (I)	10 April 1787
An Act for granting the sum of £6,000 to the lord chancellor and chief judges for the purposes therein mentioned. (Repealed by Statute Law Revision (Ireland) Act 1879 (42 & 43 Vict. c. 24))
Building and Linen Manufacture Leases Act 1787	27 Geo. 3. c. 20 (I)	30 April 1787
An Act to extend the Powers given by Law to certain Persons, of making Leases of Lands, for the Purposes of building and carrying on Linen Manufacture.
County Down Court House Act 1787	27 Geo. 3. c. 21 (I)	10 April 1787
An Act for regulating the Presentments for making the Publick Roads in the County of Down, and appropriating a Proportion of a Balance now in the Hands of the Treasurer of said County, towards the Repairs of the County Court House.
Manor Courts Small Debts Act 1787 (repealed)	27 Geo. 3. c. 22 (I)	7 May 1787
An Act to render more effectual an Act, entitled, "An Act for the more speedy and easy Recovery of Small Debts in the Manor Courts within this Kingdom, and for regulating the Costs of Proceedings for that Purpose therein." (Note: Manor Courts Small Debts Act 1785 (25 Geo. 3. c. 44 (I))) (Repealed by Statute Law Revision (Ireland) Act 1879 (42 & 43 Vict. c. 24))
Registry of Ships Act 1787^{(Republic of Ireland)}	27 Geo. 3. c. 23 (I)	7 May 1787
An Act for the further Increase and Encouragement of Shipping and Navigation.
Royal Exchange Duties Act 1787 (repealed)	27 Geo. 3. c. 24 (I)	7 May 1787
An Act for granting to His Majesty the Duties therein mentioned to be paid to the Trustees of the Royal Exchange. (Repealed by Statute Law Revision (Ireland) Act 1879 (42 & 43 Vict. c. 24))
Pilots Act 1787^{(Republic of Ireland)}	27 Geo. 3. c. 25 (I)	7 May 1787
An Act for promoting the Improvement of Ports and Harbours in this Kingdom.
Revenue Collection Act 1787 (repealed)	27 Geo. 3. c. 26 (I)	14 May 1787
An Act for the better collection of his majesty's revenue, and for the continuation and amendment of several laws heretofore made for that purpose. (Repealed by Statute Law Revision (Ireland) Act 1879 (42 & 43 Vict. c. 24))
Mediterranean Passes Act 1787 (repealed)	27 Geo. 3. c. 27 (I)	14 May 1787
An Act to prevent the forging, selling, or otherwise improperly disposing of Mediterranean Passes. (Repealed by Statute Law Revision (Ireland) Act 1879 (42 & 43 Vict. c. 24))
Regulation of Manifests Act 1787^{(Republic of Ireland)}	27 Geo. 3. c. 28 (I)	14 May 1787
An Act for regulating the Production of Manifests, and for more effectually preventing fraudulent Practices in obtaining Bounties and Drawbacks, and in the clandestine re-landing of Goods.
Duties and Lottery Offices Regulation Act 1787 (repealed)	27 Geo. 3. c. 29 (I)	21 May 1787
An Act for granting to his majesty the several duties therein mentioned, and for the better regulation of lottery offices. (Repealed by Statute Law Revision (Ireland) Act 1879 (42 & 43 Vict. c. 24))
Inland Navigations Fund Act 1787 (repealed)	27 Geo. 3. c. 30 (I)	21 May 1787
An Act for directing the Application of the Funds granted by Parliament, for promoting and carrying on Inland Navigations in this Kingdom, and for the Purposes therein mentioned. (Repealed by Statute Law Revision (Ireland) Act 1879 (42 & 43 Vict. c. 24))
Fisheries Improvement Act 1787	27 Geo. 3. c. 31 (I)	21 May 1787
An Act to amend an Act, intituled, "An Act for the further Improvement of the Fisheries on the Coasts of the Kingdom." (Note: Fisheries Act 1775 (15 & 16 Geo. 3. c. 19 (I)))
Forfeited Recognizances Act 1787	27 Geo. 3. c. 32 (I)	21 May 1787
An Act for the better Collection of his Majesty's Revenue arising from Forfeited Recognizances.
Portugal and Spanish Wines Duties Repayment Act 1787 (repealed)	27 Geo. 3. c. 33 (I)	28 May 1787
An Act to empower the commissioners of his majesty's revenue to grant repayments of certain duties on Portugal and Spanish wines in certain cases. (Repealed by Statute Law Revision (Ireland) Act 1879 (42 & 43 Vict. c. 24))
Stealing of Dogs Act 1787 (repealed)	27 Geo. 3. c. 34 (I)	28 May 1787
An Act to prevent the Stealing of Dogs. (Repealed by Criminal Statutes (Ireland) Repeal Act 1828 (9 Geo. 4. c. 53))
Game Act 1787^{(Republic of Ireland)}	27 Geo. 3. c. 35 (I)	28 May 1787
An Act for the Preservation of the Game.
Tithes Recovery Act 1787 (repealed)	27 Geo. 3. c. 36 (I)	21 May 1787
An Act to enable all ecclesiastical persons, and all rectors, vicars and curates, and those deriving by, from or under them, to recover a just compensation for the tithes withheld from them in the year 1786, in the several counties therein mentioned, against such persons who were liable to the same. (Repealed by Statute Law Revision (Ireland) Act 1879 (42 & 43 Vict. c. 24))
Baking Trade Regulation Act 1787	27 Geo. 3. c. 37 (I)	28 May 1787
An Act for regulating the baking trade.
Dublin Hackney Carriages and Porters Act 1787 (repealed)	27 Geo. 3. c. 38 (I)	21 May 1787
An Act for the better regulation of hackney carriages, hackney sedans and porters plying for hire in the city of Dublin or within seven miles thereof, and for transferring the receipt and management of certain duties from the governors of the foundling hospital and workhouse in the said city to the commissioners of police. (Repealed by Statute Law Revision (Ireland) Act 1879 (42 & 43 Vict. c. 24))
Prisons Regulation Act 1787 (repealed)	27 Geo. 3. c. 39 (I)	21 May 1787
An Act to explain and amend an Act passed in the Twenty-sixth Year of his present Majesty's Reign, entitled, "An Act for amending and carrying more effectually into force the several Laws now in being for regulating the publick Gaols and Prisons throughout this Kingdom." (Note: Prisons Regulation Act 1786 (26 Geo. 3. c. 27 (I))) (Repealed by Statute Law Revision (Ireland) Act 1879 (42 & 43 Vict. c. 24))
Peace Preservation Act 1787 (repealed)	27 Geo. 3. c. 40 (I)	21 May 1787
An Act for the better Execution of the Law, and Preservation of the Peace within Counties at large. (Repealed by Statute Law Revision (Ireland) Act 1879 (42 & 43 Vict. c. 24))
Weights and Measures Act 1787^{(Republic of Ireland)}	27 Geo. 3. c. 41 (I)	21 May 1787
An Act for amending and making perpetual an Act, entitled, "An Act for buying and selling all Sorts of Corn and Meal, and other Things therein mentioned, by Weight, and for the more effectual preventing of Frauds committed in the buying and selling thereof." (Note: Weights and Measures Act 1705 (4 Anne c. 14 (I)))
Agriculture and Corn Carriage Act 1787 (repealed)	27 Geo. 3. c. 42 (I)	21 May 1787
An Act to prevent Frauds in obtaining Bounties under several Laws now in force for the Encouragement of Agriculture, and for rendering the Carriage of Corn to the City of Dublin less expensive. (Repealed by Statute Law Revision (Ireland) Act 1879 (42 & 43 Vict. c. 24))
Dublin Wide Passages Act 1787	27 Geo. 3. c. 43 (I)	28 May 1787
An Act for the further explaining and amending the several acts now in force for making wide and convenient passages in the city of Dublin.
Badging the Poor Act 1787 (repealed)	27 Geo. 3. c. 44 (I)	
An Act to explain and amend an Act passed in the Eleventh and Twelfth Tears of His present Majesty, entitled, "An Act for Badging such Poor as shall be found unable to support themselves by Labour, and otherwise providing for them, and for refraining such as shall be found able to support themselves by Labour or Industry from Begging." (Note: Badging and Begging (Ireland) Act 1771 (11 & 12 Geo. 3. c. 30 (I))) (Repealed by Statute Law Revision (Ireland) Act 1879 (42 & 43 Vict. c. 24))
Dublin to Mullingar Road Act 1787	27 Geo. 3. c. 45 (I)	21 May 1787
An Act to amend an act entitled an act for continuing and amending the several laws relating to the repairs of the turnpike road leading from Dublin to Mullingar, and for more effectually enabling the trustees thereof to widen the narrow parts leading from Chapelizod to Dublin on the north and south sides of the River Liffey.
Market Juries Act 1787	27 Geo. 3. c. 46 (I)	28 May 1787
An Act for establishing Market Juries in Cities.
Trade with United States Act 1787 (repealed)	27 Geo. 3. c. 47 (I)	7 May 1787
An Act for continuing an Act, entitled "An Act for facilitating the trade and intercourse between this kingdom and the United States of America." (Note: Trade with United States Act 1783 (23 & 24 Geo. 3. c. 9 (I))) (Repealed by Statute Law Revision (Ireland) Act 1879 (42 & 43 Vict. c. 24))
Quarantine Act 1787 (repealed)	27 Geo. 3. c. 48 (I)	21 May 1787
An Act to continue an act passed in the 11th year of his present majesty's reign entitled "An Act to oblige ships more effectually to perform their quarantine, and for the better preventing the plague being brought from foreign parts into Ireland, and to hinder the spreading of infection." (Note: Quarantine Act 1770 (11 Geo. 3. c. 11 (I))) (Repealed by Statute Law Revision (Ireland) Act 1879 (42 & 43 Vict. c. 24))
Arrears of Quit and Crown Rents Act 1787 (repealed)	27 Geo. 3. c. 49 (I)	21 May 1787
An Act for amending an Act, entitled, "An Act for discharging certain Arrears of Quit, Crown, and Composition Rents which have been growing due for Twenty Years last past, on the Terms and in the Manner therein mentioned." (Note: Quit and Crown Rents Arrears Act 1783 (23 & 24 Geo. 3. c. 47 (I))) (Repealed by Statute Law Revision (Ireland) Act 1879 (42 & 43 Vict. c. 24))
Greenland and Davis's Streights Fisheries Act 1787 (repealed)	27 Geo. 3. c. 50 (I)	14 May 1787
An Act for the support and encouragement of the fisheries carried on in the Greenland Seas and Davis's Streights. (Repealed by Statute Law Revision (Ireland) Act 1879 (42 & 43 Vict. c. 24))
Unqualified Persons Relief Act 1787 (repealed)	27 Geo. 3. c. 51 (I)	21 May 1787
An Act for the Relief of Persons who have omitted to qualify themselves according to Law. (Repealed by Statute Law Revision (Ireland) Act 1879 (42 & 43 Vict. c. 24))
Stealing Lead, Iron, etc. Act 1787 (repealed)	27 Geo. 3. c. 52 (I)	21 May 1787
An Act to punish more effectually Persons who shall Steal any old Lead, Iron Bars, or Rails, or Iron or Brass Knockers. (Repealed by Criminal Statutes (Ireland) Repeal Act 1828 (9 Geo. 4. c. 53))
Turnpike Gates Destruction Prevention Act 1787 (repealed)	27 Geo. 3. c. 53 (I)	21 May 1787
An Act for preventing the wilful Destruction of Turnpike Gates, and for the better securing the Payment of Tolls at such Gates. (Repealed by Summary Jurisdiction (Ireland) Act 1851 (14 & 15 Vict. c. 92))
Dublin Society Grant Act 1787 (repealed)	27 Geo. 3. c. 54 (I)	7 May 1787
An Act for granting the sum of £5,000 to the Dublin Society for the purposes therein mentioned. (Repealed by Statute Law Revision (Ireland) Act 1879 (42 & 43 Vict. c. 24))
Pious and Charitable Purposes Grant Act 1787 (repealed)	27 Geo. 3. c. 55 (I)	7 May 1787
An Act for granting the several sums therein mentioned for certain pious and charitable purposes. (Repealed by Statute Law Revision (Ireland) Act 1879 (42 & 43 Vict. c. 24))
Public Uses Grant Act 1787 (repealed)	27 Geo. 3. c. 56 (I)	7 May 1787
An Act for granting the several sums therein mentioned for certain public uses and for the other purposes therein mentioned. (Repealed by Statute Law Revision (Ireland) Act 1879 (42 & 43 Vict. c. 24))
Badging the Poor Amendment Act 1787 (repealed)	27 Geo. 3. c. 57 (I)	21 May 1787
An Act for amending an Act made in the Eleventh and Twelfth Years of His present Majesty's Reign, entitled, "An Act for Badging such Poor as shall be found unable to support themselves by Labour, and otherwise providing for them, and for refraining such as shall be found able to support themselves by Labour and Industry from Begging," and also to amend an Act made in the Thirteenth and Fourteenth Years of His present Majesty's Reign, (Note: Poor Relief (Badging) Act 1773 (13 & 14 Geo. 3. c. 46 (I))) entitled, "An Act for amending an Act made the last Session of Parliament, entitled, 'An Act for Badging such Poor as shall be found unable to support themselves by Labour, and otherwise providing for them, and for refraining such as shall be found able to support themselves by Labour or Industry from Begging.'" (Repealed by Statute Law Revision (Ireland) Act 1879 (42 & 43 Vict. c. 24))
Nenagh to O'Brien's Bridge Road Act 1787	27 Geo. 3. c. 58 (I)	21 May 1787
An Act to explain and amend an act passed in the 19th and 20th years of his present majesty entitled "An Act for making and keeping in repair a road to lead from Nenagh (Note: Nenagh, County Tipperary.) in the county of Tipperary to O'Brien's Bridge (Note: O'Brien's Bridge, County Clare.) in the county of Clare." (Note: Nenagh to O'Brien's Bridge Road Act 1779 (19 & 20 Geo. 3. c. 46 (I)))
Dublin to Dunleer Road Act 1787	27 Geo. 3. c. 59 (I)	21 May 1787
An Act for improving and repairing the Turnpike Road from Dublin to Dunleer.
Road from Dublin to Kilcullen Act 1787	27 Geo. 3. c. 60 (I)	24 May 1787
An Act for improving and repairing the Turnpike Road leading from the City of Dublin to Kilcullen Bridge in the County of Kildare, and to the Twenty-one Mile Stone Westward of the said Bridge.

=== Private acts ===
Short title, or popular name	Citation	Royal assent
Long title
Butler's Estate Act 1787	27 Geo. 3. c. 1 Pr. (I)	7 May 1787
An Act for vesting lands and premises, the estate of Stephen Creagh Butler, esquire, in trustees, to be sold for payment of debts, and for other purposes therein mentioned.
Nugent's Estate Act 1787	27 Geo. 3. c. 2 Pr. (I)	7 May 1787
An Act for vesting in trustees the estates of Sir James Nugent of Donore in the county of Westmeath, baronet, for the purpose of raising money to discharge the original encumbrances affecting the same, and to pay the debts of the said Sir James Nugent, and also for providing and settling a jointure on Mary Nugent, wife of Peter Nugent, esquire, the only brother of the said Sir James Nugent.
Hyde's Estate Act 1787	27 Geo. 3. c. 3 Pr. (I)	7 May 1787
An Act for vesting certain lands in trustees, to be sold for payment of the debts of John Hyde of Creg in the county of Cork, esquire, and for securing and settling other lands in lieu thereof, to and for the same uses and purposes as the lands intended to be sold are now settled.
Earl of Ross's Estate Act 1787	27 Geo. 3. c. 4 Pr. (I)	7 May 1787
An Act for vesting in trustees the settled estates of Ralph, earl of Ross, in the counties of Galway and Donegal, in order to be sold or mortgaged for the payment of his debts, and for settling the unsettled estate of the said Ralph, earl of Ross, in the county of Fermanagh, and other estates to be purchased in the place and stead of the said estate so to be sold or mortgaged as aforesaid, and for other purposes.
M'Donnell's Estate Act 1787	27 Geo. 3. c. 5 Pr. (I)	7 May 1787
An Act for vesting certain lands therein mentioned, late the estate of Charles M'Donnell of Newhall in the county of Clare, esquire, deceased, in trustees, for payment of the debts and encumbrances affecting the same, and for other purposes.
Earl of Ely's Will Act 1787	27 Geo. 3. c. 6 Pr. (I)	21 May 1787
An Act to remove certain doubts which have arisen in the will of Henry, earl of Ely, deceased, relative to the residence of Ann, countess of Ely, within this kingdom.

=== Sources ===
- "Acts of Parliament by Session: 1787". Irish Legislation Database. Queen's University Belfast.
- "Pre-Union Irish Statutes: 1787 Acts". Irish Statute Book. Attorney General of Ireland.

== 28 Geo. 3 (1788) ==
The 5th session of the 4th parliament of George III, which met from 17 January 1788 to 18 April 1788.

This session was also traditionally cited as 28 G. 3.

=== Public acts ===
Short title, or popular name	Citation	Royal assent
Long title
Additional Duties Act 1788 (repealed)	28 Geo. 3. c. 1 (I)	20 March 1788
An Act for granting unto his majesty, his heirs and successors an additional duty on wines, hides, beer, ale and other goods and merchandises therein mentioned, and for prohibiting the importation of all gold and silver lace, except of the manufacture of Great Britain, and of all cambrics and lawns and glass, except of the manufacture of Great Britain and France and the French dominions in Europe, and of all hops, except of the growth of Great Britain and British plantations. (Repealed by Statute Law Revision (Ireland) Act 1879 (42 & 43 Vict. c. 24))
Loan Duties Act 1788 (repealed)	28 Geo. 3. c. 2 (I)	20 March 1788
An Act for granting to his majesty the several aids, duties, rates, impositions and taxes therein particularly expressed to be applied to the payment of the interest of the sums therein provided for, and towards the discharge of the said principal sums in such manner as therein is directed, and for such other purposes as are therein mentioned. (Repealed by Statute Law Revision (Ireland) Act 1879 (42 & 43 Vict. c. 24))
Malt Duties Act 1788 (repealed)	28 Geo. 3. c. 3 (I)	20 March 1788
An Act for granting unto his majesty, his heirs and successors certain duties upon malt. (Repealed by Statute Law Revision (Ireland) Act 1879 (42 & 43 Vict. c. 24))
Trade Advancement Act 1788 (repealed)	28 Geo. 3. c. 4 (I)	20 March 1788
An Act for the advancement of trade, and for granting to his majesty, his heirs and successors the several duties therein mentioned. (Repealed by Statute Law Revision (Ireland) Act 1879 (42 & 43 Vict. c. 24))
Tobacco Trade Act 1788 (repealed)	28 Geo. 3. c. 5 (I)	20 March 1788
An Act for regulating and extending the tobacco trade, and for granting unto his majesty, his heirs and successors the duties therein mentioned. (Repealed by Statute Law Revision (Ireland) Act 1879 (42 & 43 Vict. c. 24))
Sugar Trade Act 1788 (repealed)	28 Geo. 3. c. 6 (I)	20 March 1788
An Act for regulating the sugar trade, and for granting to his majesty, his heirs and successors the several duties therein mentioned. (Repealed by Statute Law Revision (Ireland) Act 1879 (42 & 43 Vict. c. 24))
Coffee Trade Act 1788 (repealed)	28 Geo. 3. c. 7 (I)	20 March 1788
An Act for regulating the coffee trade, and for granting to his majesty, his heirs and successors the several duties therein mentioned upon coffee. (Repealed by Statute Law Revision (Ireland) Act 1879 (42 & 43 Vict. c. 24))
Linen and Hempen Manufactures Act 1788	28 Geo. 3. c. 8 (I)	20 March 1788
An Act to promote the linen and hempen manufactures by increasing the supply of Irish flax seed, and encouraging the export of linens and sail cloth, and for granting to his majesty, his heirs and successors the duties therein mentioned.
Stamp Duties Act 1788 (repealed)	28 Geo. 3. c. 9 (I)	20 March 1788
An Act for granting unto his majesty, his heirs and successors several duties therein mentioned to be levied by the commissioners for managing the stamp duties. (Repealed by Statute Law Revision (Ireland) Act 1879 (42 & 43 Vict. c. 24))
French Commercial Treaty Act 1788 (repealed)	28 Geo. 3. c. 10 (I)	20 March 1788
An Act for granting certain aids, duties and impositions to his majesty, his heirs and successors for the time therein mentioned, and for giving effect to a treaty of commerce and navigation concluded between his majesty and the most Christian king. (Note: 'Most Christian King' is a reference to the King of France.) (Repealed by Statute Law Revision (Ireland) Act 1879 (42 & 43 Vict. c. 24))
Hawkers and Pedlars Act 1788 (repealed)	28 Geo. 3. c. 11 (I)	20 March 1788
An Act for licensing hawkers and pedlars, petty chapmen and other persons. (Repealed by Statute Law Revision (Ireland) Act 1879 (42 & 43 Vict. c. 24))
Postage Duties Act 1788 (repealed)	28 Geo. 3. c. 12 (I)	20 March 1788
An Act for granting to his majesty, his heirs and successors certain rates and duties upon the portage and conveyance of all letters and packets within this kingdom, and for the purposes therein mentioned. (Repealed by Statute Law Revision (Ireland) Act 1879 (42 & 43 Vict. c. 24))
Post Office Act 1788 (repealed)	28 Geo. 3. c. 13 (I)	20 February 1788
An Act to explain and amend an Act passed in the Twenty-third and Twenty-fourth Years of his present Majesty's Reign, entitled, "An Act for establishing a Post Office within this Kingdom." (Note: Post Office Act 1783 (23 & 24 Geo. 3. c. 17 (I))) (Repealed by Post Office (Repeal of Laws) Act 1837 (7 Will. 4 & 1 Vict. c. 32))
Dublin to Dunleer Road Act 1788	28 Geo. 3. c. 14 (I)	18 April 1788
An Act to amend an Act passed in the last Session of Parliament, (Note: Dublin to Dunleer Road Act 1787 (27 Geo. 3. c. 59 (I))) for improving and repairing the Turnpike Road from Dublin (Note: Dublin.) to Dunleer.
Endowed Schools Commission Act 1788 (repealed)	28 Geo. 3. c. 15 (I)	18 April 1788
An Act to enable the lord lieutenant, or other chief governor or governors of this kingdom, to appoint commissioners for enquiring into the several funds or revenues granted by public or private donations for the purposes of education in this kingdom, and into the state and condition of all schools in this kingdom on public or charitable foundations, and of the funds appropriated for the maintenance and support thereof, and for other purposes therein mentioned. (Repealed by Statute Law Revision (Ireland) Act 1879 (42 & 43 Vict. c. 24))
Licensing Duties Act 1788 (repealed)	28 Geo. 3. c. 16 (I)	20 March 1788
An Act for granting certain duties upon licences to be taken out by the several persons therein mentioned. (Repealed by Statute Law Revision (Ireland) Act 1879 (42 & 43 Vict. c. 24))
Carriage Duties Act 1788 (repealed)	28 Geo. 3. c. 17 (I)	20 March 1788
An Act for granting unto his majesty, his heirs and successors certain duties on carriages. (Repealed by Statute Law Revision (Ireland) Act 1879 (42 & 43 Vict. c. 24))
Trade with United States Act 1788 (repealed)	28 Geo. 3. c. 18 (I)	20 March 1788
An Act for facilitating the trade and intercourse between this kingdom and the United States of America. (Repealed by Statute Law Revision (Ireland) Act 1879 (42 & 43 Vict. c. 24))
Mutiny Act (Ireland) 1788 (repealed)	28 Geo. 3. c. 19 (I)	20 March 1788
An Act for punishing Mutiny and Desertion, and for the better Payment of the Army and their Quarters within this Kingdom. (Repealed by Statute Law Revision (Ireland) Act 1879 (42 & 43 Vict. c. 24))
Lord Chancellor and Judges Grant Act 1788 (repealed)	28 Geo. 3. c. 20 (I)	20 March 1788
An Act for granting the sum of £6,000 to the lord chancellor and chief judges for the purposes therein mentioned. (Repealed by Statute Law Revision (Ireland) Act 1879 (42 & 43 Vict. c. 24))
Linen Manufacture Grant Act 1788 (repealed)	28 Geo. 3. c. 21 (I)	20 March 1788
An Act for granting the sum of £4,000 to the trustees of the linen manufacture for the purposes therein mentioned. (Repealed by Statute Law Revision (Ireland) Act 1879 (42 & 43 Vict. c. 24))
Dublin Society Grant Act 1788 (repealed)	28 Geo. 3. c. 22 (I)	20 May 1788
An Act for granting the sum of £5,000 to the Dublin Society for the purposes therein mentioned. (Repealed by Statute Law Revision (Ireland) Act 1879 (42 & 43 Vict. c. 24))
Royal Exchange Duties Act 1788 (repealed)	28 Geo. 3. c. 23 (I)	20 March 1788
An Act for granting to his majesty the duties therein mentioned to be paid to the trustees of the Royal Exchange. (Repealed by Statute Law Revision (Ireland) Act 1879 (42 & 43 Vict. c. 24))
Election of Lord Justice and Governor of Ireland Act 1788 (repealed)	28 Geo. 3. c. 24 (I)	18 April 1788
An Act for repealing an Act made in the Thirty-third Year of the Reign of King Henry the Eighth, entitled, "An Act for the Election of the Lord Justice," (Note: Lord Justice Elections Act 1542 (33 Hen. 8 Sess. 2. c. 2 (I))) and also for the Election of a Lord Justice and Governor of this Realm upon the Event, and in Manner therein mentioned. (Repealed for the Republic of Ireland by Statute Law Revision (Pre-Union Irish Statutes) Act 1962 (No. 29) and for Northern Ireland by the Statute Law Revision Act 1950 (14 Geo. 6. c. 6))
Baking Trade Act 1788	28 Geo. 3. c. 25 (I)	18 April 1788
An Act to amend an act passed in the last session of parliament entitled "An Act for regulating the baking trade." (Note: Baking Trade Regulation Act 1787 (27 Geo. 3. c. 37 (I)))
Manufactures Bounties Act 1788 (repealed)	28 Geo. 3. c. 26 (I)	28 March 1788
An Act for continuing the encouragement by bounties to the several manufactures therein named for a certain and limited time. (Repealed by Statute Law Revision (Ireland) Act 1879 (42 & 43 Vict. c. 24))
Fisheries Act 1788	28 Geo. 3. c. 27 (I)	18 April 1788
An Act to explain and amend the Laws relative to the Fisheries on the Coasts of this Kingdom.
Newcastle, Limerick, and Cork Road Act 1788	28 Geo. 3. c. 28 (I)	An Act
An Act to continue and amend an act passed in the 5th year of his late majesty's reign entitled "An Act for repairing the road leading from the town of Newcastle (Note: Newcastle West, County Limerick.) in the county of Limerick to the city of Limerick, (Note: Limerick, County Limerick.) and from thence to the city of Cork." (Note: Cork, County Cork.) (Note: Newcastle, Limerick, and Cork Road Act 1731 (5 Geo. 2. c. 22 (I)))
Hemp Tithes Act 1788 (repealed)	28 Geo. 3. c. 29 (I)	18 April 1788
An Act for the better ascertaining the Tithes of Hemp. (Repealed by Statute Law Revision (Ireland) Act 1879 (42 & 43 Vict. c. 24))
Pious and Charitable Purposes Act 1788 (repealed)	28 Geo. 3. c. 30 (I)	20 March 1788
An Act for granting the several sums therein mentioned for certain pious and charitable purposes. (Repealed by Statute Law Revision (Ireland) Act 1879 (42 & 43 Vict. c. 24))
Law Amendment Act 1788 (repealed)	28 Geo. 3. c. 31 (I)	18 April 1788
An Act for the Amendment of the Law in certain Particular therein mentioned. (Repealed by Statute Law Revision (Ireland) Act 1879 (42 & 43 Vict. c. 24))
Appeals Act 1788 (repealed)	28 Geo. 3. c. 32 (I)	18 April 1788
An Act to repeal an act passed in the 28th year of the reign of King Henry VIII entitled "An Act of appeals" (Note: Act of Appeals (Ireland) 1537 (28 Hen. 8. c. 6 (I))) and to enable the lord chancellor, lord keeper or lords commissioners for the custody of the great seal of this kingdom for the time being to issue commissions of appeal from the courts of the archbishops within the same. (Repealed by Statute Law Revision (Ireland) Act 1879 (42 & 43 Vict. c. 24))
Parliamentary Registration Act 1788	28 Geo. 3. c. 33 (I)	18 April 1788
An Act for the further amendment of the law relative to the registering of freeholders.
Revenue Frauds Act 1788 (repealed)	28 Geo. 3. c. 34 (I)	18 April 1788
An Act for more effectually preventing frauds against his majesty's revenue, and for continuing and amending the several acts of parliament therein mentioned. (Repealed by Statute Law Revision (Ireland) Act 1879 (42 & 43 Vict. c. 24))
Purchasers Protection Act 1788 (repealed)	28 Geo. 3. c. 35 (I)	18 April 1788
An Act for the better securing of Purchasers of Lands, under Decrees in Courts of Equity. (Repealed by Statute Law Revision (Ireland) Act 1879 (42 & 43 Vict. c. 24))
Timber Act 1788 (repealed)	28 Geo. 3. c. 36 (I)	18 April 1788
An Act to explain and amend an Act passed in the Fifth and Sixth years of His present Majesty, George the Third, entitled "An Act for the encouraging the Cultivation end better preservation of Trees, Shrubs, Plants and Roots." (Note: Timber Act 1775 (15 & 16 Geo. 3. c. 26 (I))) (Repealed by Statute Law Revision (Ireland) Act 1879 (42 & 43 Vict. c. 24))
Sheep Stealing Act 1788 (repealed)	28 Geo. 3. c. 37 (I)	18 April 1788
An Act for the better Preservation of Sheep, and the more Speedy Detection of Sheep Stealers. (Repealed by Criminal Statutes (Ireland) Repeal Act 1828 (9 Geo. 4. c. 53))
Courthouses and Gaols Act 1788^{(Republic of Ireland)}	28 Geo. 3. c. 38 (I)	28 March 1788
An Act for using the Court-Houses of Counties at large, and Counties of Cities where situate within the Precincts of the same Counties, for the Purposes of both Counties, and for declaring that Gaols for Counties at large, situate within Counties of Cities, shall be deemed Part of such Counties at large.
Cork Gaol Act 1788	28 Geo. 3. c. 39 (I)	28 March 1788
An Act for building a new and convenient Gaol for the Count of Cork, and for other Purposes relative to the said County.
Inland Navigations Debts Act 1788 (repealed)	28 Geo. 3. c. 40 (I)	18 April 1788
An Act for the further payment of the debts of the late corporation for promoting inland navigations in Ireland, by rectifying an omission in the schedule annexed to the act of last session entitled an act for directing the application of the funds granted by parliament for promoting and carrying on inland navigations in this kingdom, and for the purposes therein mentioned. (Repealed by Statute Law Revision (Ireland) Act 1879 (42 & 43 Vict. c. 24))
Qualification Indemnity Act 1788 (repealed)	28 Geo. 3. c. 41 (I)	18 April 1788
An Act for the Relief of Persons who have omitted to qualify themselves according to Law. (Repealed by Statute Law Revision (Ireland) Act 1879 (42 & 43 Vict. c. 24))
Bankrupts and Temporary Statutes Act 1788 (repealed)	28 Geo. 3. c. 42 (I)	18 April 1788
An Act for continuing the Acts relative to Bankrupts, and for reviving, continuing, and amending certain Temporary Statutes. (Repealed by Statute Law Revision (Ireland) Act 1879 (42 & 43 Vict. c. 24))
Talbot's Canal Act 1788	28 Geo. 3. c. 43 (I)	18 April 1788
An Act for making a Navigable Canal from the Town of Malahide in the County of Dublin, to the River of Fieldflown in the said County.
Tithes Recovery Act 1788 (repealed)	28 Geo. 3. c. 44 (I)	28 March 1788
An Act to enable all ecclesiastical persons and bodies, rectors, vicars and curates, and impropriators, and those deriving by, from or under them, to recover a just compensation for the tithes withheld from them in the year 1787, in the several counties therein mentioned, against such persons who were liable to the same, and to explain and amend an act made in the 27th year of his majesty's reign entitled "An Act to enable all ecclesiastical persons, and all rectors, vicars and curates, and impropriators, and those deriving by, from or under them, to recover a just compensation for the tithes withheld from them in the year 1786, in the several counties therein mentioned, against such persons who were liable to the same." (Note: Tithes Recovery Act 1787 (27 Geo. 3. c. 36 (I))) (Repealed by Statute Law Revision (Ireland) Act 1879 (42 & 43 Vict. c. 24))
Dublin Police Act 1788 (repealed)	28 Geo. 3. c. 45 (I)	18 April 1788
An Act to explain and amend an act of the 26th year of his present majesty's reign (Note: Forcible Entry Act 1786 (26 Geo. 3. c. 24 (I))) entitled "An Act for the better execution of the law within the city of Dublin and certain parts adjoining thereto, and for quieting and protecting possessions within this kingdom, for the more expeditious transportation of felons, for reviving, continuing and amending certain statutes therein mentioned, and for repealing an act passed in the 17th and 18th years of his present majesty (Note: Dublin Police Act 1777 (17 & 18 Geo. 3. c. 43 (I))) entitled "An Act for improving the police of the city of Dublin, and for other purposes. (Repealed by Statute Law Revision (Ireland) Act 1879 (42 & 43 Vict. c. 24))
Insolvent Debtors Relief Act 1788 (repealed)	28 Geo. 3. c. 46 (I)	18 April 1788
An Act for the Relief of Insolvent Debtors, with respect to the Imprisonment of their Persons. (Repealed by Statute Law Revision (Ireland) Act 1879 (42 & 43 Vict. c. 24))
Dublin to Kilcullen Road Act 1788	28 Geo. 3. c. 47 (I)	18 April 1788
To explain and amend an act passed in the 27th year of his present majesty entitled "An Act for improving and repairing the turnpike road leading from the city of Dublin to Kilcullen Bridge (Note: Kilcullen Bridge, Kilcullen, County Kildare.) in the county of Kildare and to the 21 mile stone westward of the said bridge." (Note: Road from Dublin to Kilcullen Act 1787 (27 Geo. 3. c. 60 (I)))
Dublin to Clontarf Road Act 1788	28 Geo. 3. c. 48 (I)	18 April 1788
An Act for extending to the roads leading to Dublin through Raheny (Note: Raheny, Dublin.) and Clontarf (Note: Clontarf, Dublin.) the provisions of an act passed in the 26th year of his majesty's reign entitled "An Act for making, widening and repairing the road leading from the city of Dublin to Malahide, (Note: Malahide, County Dublin.) and for erecting turnpike gates and receiving tolls thereout in aid of the barony presentments, and for appointing trustees for carrying the said purposes into execution." (Note: Dublin to Malahide Road Act 1786 (26 Geo. 3. c. 30 (I)))
Pawnbrokers Act 1788^{(Republic of Ireland)}	28 Geo. 3. c. 49 (I)	18 April 1788
An Act to explain amend and render more effectual an Act passed in the Twenty-sixth Year of the Reign of His present Majesty King George the Third, Entitled, "An Act to establish the Business of a Pawnbroker, and to authorise such Persons as shall be duly qualified to carry on the same, to lend Money on Pawns or Pledges, and to receive Interest at a higher Rate than heretofore was recoverable by Law." (Note: Pawnbrokers Act 1786 (26 Geo. 3. c. 43 (I)))
City of Dublin Act 1788 or the Dublin Improvement Act 1788	28 Geo. 3. c. 50 (I)	28 March 1788
An Act for better supplying the City of Dublin with Water, and for extending the Powers of Grand Juries, with Respect to the Roads lying within the County of the said City.

=== Private acts ===
Short title, or popular name	Citation	Royal assent
Long title
Daly's Estate Act 1788	28 Geo. 3. c. 1 Pr. (I)	18 April 1788
An Act for sale of part of the settled estate of the Right Honourable Denis Daly, for the payment of certain encumbrances affecting the same, and for other purposes therein mentioned.
Martin's Estate Act 1788	28 Geo. 3. c. 2 Pr. (I)	18 April 1788
An Act for vesting the several towns, lands, tenements and hereditaments in the counties of Galway, Mayo and Roscommon, and the county of the town of Galway, the estates of Robert and Richard Martin of Dangan in the county of Galway, esquires, in Sir Michael Cromie, baronet, and Francis Vesey, esquire, trustees, to raise a sum of money sufficient to pay off the debts and encumbrances therein mentioned.
Skerrett's Estate Act 1788	28 Geo. 3. c. 3 Pr. (I)	18 April 1788
An Act for vesting certain castles, towns, lands, tenements and hereditaments situate in the counties of Galway, Roscommon and county of the town Galway, the estates of James Skerrett of Drumgriffin in the county of Galway, esquire, in trustees, that the same or a competent part thereof may be sold or mortgaged for the payment of debts and encumbrances affecting the same.
Burke's Estate Act 1788	28 Geo. 3. c. 4 Pr. (I)	10 April 1788
An Act for vesting in trustees certain real freehold and leasehold lands situate in the counties of Galway and Roscommon, the estates and property of Michael Burke of Ballidugan in the county of Galway, esquire, in order to be sold or mortgaged for the payment of debts, charges and encumbrances affecting the same, and for other purposes.
Cooper's Estate Act 1788	28 Geo. 3. c. 5 Pr. (I)	18 April 1788
An Act for explaining and amending an act of parliament made in the 21st year of the reign of his present majesty King George III entitled "An Act for the sale of a competent part of the settled estates of Arthur Cooper, esquire, Sarah Cooper, otherwise Carlton, and William Henry Cooper, for the payment of debts and other encumbrances affecting the same, and for other purposes therein mentioned." (Note: Cooper's Estate Act 1781 (21 & 22 Geo. 3. c. 4 Pr. (I)))

=== Sources ===
- "Acts of Parliament by Session: 1788". Irish Legislation Database. Queen's University Belfast.
- "Pre-Union Irish Statutes: 1788 Acts". Irish Statute Book. Attorney General of Ireland.

== 29 Geo. 3 (1789) ==
The 6th session of the 4th parliament of George III, which met from 5 February 1789 to 25 May 1789.

This session was also traditionally cited as 29 G. 3.

=== Public acts ===
Short title, or popular name	Citation	Royal assent
Long title
Import Duties and Prohibitions Act 1789 (repealed)	29 Geo. 3. c. 1 (I)	23 May 1789
An Act for granting unto his majesty, his heirs and successors an additional duty on hides, beer, ale and other goods and merchandises therein mentioned, and for prohibiting the importation of all gold and silver lace, except of the manufacture of Great Britain, and of all cambrics and lawns, except of the manufacture of Great Britain and France, and the French dominions in Europe, and of all hops, except of the growth of Great Britain and the British plantations. (Repealed by Statute Law Revision (Ireland) Act 1879 (42 & 43 Vict. c. 24))
Government Loans and Duties Act 1789 (repealed)	29 Geo. 3. c. 2 (I)	23 March 1789
An Act for granting to his majesty the several aids, duties, rights, impositions and taxes therein particularly expressed to be applied to the payment of the interest of the principal sums therein provided for, and towards the discharge of the said principal sums in such manner as therein is directed, and for such other purposes as are therein mentioned. (Repealed by Statute Law Revision (Ireland) Act 1879 (42 & 43 Vict. c. 24))
Trade Advancement and Duties Act 1789 (repealed)	29 Geo. 3. c. 3 (I)	23 May 1789
An Act for the advancement of trade, for granting to his majesty, his heirs and successors the several duties therein mentioned. (Repealed by Statute Law Revision (Ireland) Act 1879 (42 & 43 Vict. c. 24))
Sugar Trade Regulation Act 1789 (repealed)	29 Geo. 3. c. 4 (I)	23 March 1789
An Act for regulating the sugar trade, and for granting to his majesty, his heirs and successors the several duties therein mentioned. (Repealed by Statute Law Revision (Ireland) Act 1879 (42 & 43 Vict. c. 24))
Malt Duties Act 1789 (repealed)	29 Geo. 3. c. 5 (I)	23 March 1789
An Act for granting unto his majesty, his heirs and successors certain duties upon malt. (Repealed by Statute Law Revision (Ireland) Act 1879 (42 & 43 Vict. c. 24))
Coffee Trade Regulation Act 1789 (repealed)	29 Geo. 3. c. 6 (I)	23 March 1789
An Act for regulating the coffee trade, and for granting to his majesty, his heirs and successors the several duties therein mentioned upon coffee. (Repealed by Statute Law Revision (Ireland) Act 1879 (42 & 43 Vict. c. 24))
Trade with United States Act 1789 (repealed)	29 Geo. 3. c. 7 (I)	23 March 1789
An Act for further continuing an act entitled "An Act for facilitating the trade and intercourse between this kingdom and the United States of America." (Note: Trade with United States Act 1788 (28 Geo. 3. c. 18 (I))) (Repealed by Statute Law Revision (Ireland) Act 1879 (42 & 43 Vict. c. 24))
Postage Act 1789 (repealed)	29 Geo. 3. c. 8 (I)	23 March 1789
An Act for granting to his majesty, his heirs and successors certain rates and duties upon the portage and conveyance of all letters and packets within this kingdom. (Repealed by Statute Law Revision (Ireland) Act 1879 (42 & 43 Vict. c. 24))
Stamp Act 1789 (repealed)	29 Geo. 3. c. 9 (I)	23 March 1789
An Act for granting unto his majesty, his heirs and successors several duties therein mentioned to be levied by the commissioners for managing the stamp duties. (Repealed by Statute Law Revision (Ireland) Act 1879 (42 & 43 Vict. c. 24))
Tobacco Act 1789 (repealed)	29 Geo. 3. c. 10 (I)	23 March 1789
An Act for regulating and extending the tobacco trade, and for granting to his majesty, his heirs and successors the duties therein mentioned. (Repealed by Statute Law Revision (Ireland) Act 1879 (42 & 43 Vict. c. 24))
Mutiny Act (Ireland) 1789 (repealed)	29 Geo. 3. c. 11 (I)	23 March 1789
An Act for punishing mutiny and desertion, and for the better payment of the army and their quarters within this kingdom. (Repealed by Statute Law Revision (Ireland) Act 1879 (42 & 43 Vict. c. 24))
Aids and Duties Act 1789 (repealed)	29 Geo. 3. c. 12 (I)	23 March 1789
An Act for granting certain aids, duties and impositions to his majesty, his heirs and successors from the time therein mentioned, and for continuing the effect of a treaty of commerce and navigation concluded between his majesty and the most Christian king. (Note: 'Most Christian King' is a reference to the King of France.) (Repealed by Statute Law Revision (Ireland) Act 1879 (42 & 43 Vict. c. 24))
Linen and Hempen Manufacture Act 1789 (repealed)	29 Geo. 3. c. 13 (I)	23 March 1789
An Act to promote the linen and hempen manufactures by increasing of Irish flax seed, and encouraging the exportation of linens and sail cloth, and for granting to his majesty, his heirs and successors therein mentioned. (Repealed by Statute Law Revision (Ireland) Act 1879 (42 & 43 Vict. c. 24))
Duties on Licences Act 1789 (repealed)	29 Geo. 3. c. 14 (I)	23 March 1789
An Act for granting certain duties upon licences to be taken out by the several persons therein mentioned. (Repealed by Statute Law Revision (Ireland) Act 1879 (42 & 43 Vict. c. 24))
Carriage Duties Act 1789 (repealed)	29 Geo. 3. c. 15 (I)	23 March 1789
An Act for granting unto his majesty, his heirs and successors certain duties upon carriages. (Repealed by Statute Law Revision (Ireland) Act 1879 (42 & 43 Vict. c. 24))
Hawkers and Pedlars Act 1789 (repealed)	29 Geo. 3. c. 16 (I)	23 March 1789
An Act for licensing hawkers and pedlars, petty chapmen and other persons. (Repealed by Statute Law Revision (Ireland) Act 1879 (42 & 43 Vict. c. 24))
Wine Duties (repealed)	29 Geo. 3. c. 17 (I)	23 March 1789
An Act for granting unto his majesty, his heirs and successors duties on wines therein mentioned, and cordage, and also a tax upon all salaries, profits of employment, fees and pensions therein mentioned. (Repealed by Statute Law Revision (Ireland) Act 1879 (42 & 43 Vict. c. 24))
Import Duties and Prohibitions (No. 2) Act 1789 (repealed)	29 Geo. 3. c. 18 (I)	25 May 1789
An Act for granting unto his majesty, his heirs and successors an additional duty on hides, beer and ale and other goods and merchandises therein mentioned, and for prohibiting the importation of all gold and silver lace, except of the manufacture of Great Britain, and of all cambrics, lawns and glass, except of the manufacture of Great Britain and France, and the French dominions in Europe, and of all hops, except of the growth of Great Britain and the British plantations. (Repealed by Statute Law Revision (Ireland) Act 1879 (42 & 43 Vict. c. 24))
Duties on Malt etc. Act 1789 (repealed)	29 Geo. 3. c. 19 (I)	25 May 1789
An Act for granting unto his majesty, his heirs and successors certain duties upon malt. (Repealed by Statute Law Revision (Ireland) Act 1879 (42 & 43 Vict. c. 24))
Postage (No. 2) Act 1789 (repealed)	29 Geo. 3. c. 20 (I)	25 May 1789
An Act for granting to his majesty, his heirs and successors certain rates and duties upon the portage and conveyance of all letters and packets within this kingdom. (Repealed by Statute Law Revision (Ireland) Act 1879 (42 & 43 Vict. c. 24))
Stamp (No. 2) Act 1789 (repealed)	29 Geo. 3. c. 21 (I)	25 May 1789
An Act for granting unto his majesty, his heirs and successors several duties therein mentioned to be levied by the commissioners for managing the stamp duties. (Repealed by Statute Law Revision (Ireland) Act 1879 (42 & 43 Vict. c. 24))
Mutiny (No. 2) Act (Ireland) 1789 (repealed)	29 Geo. 3. c. 22 (I)	25 May 1789
An Act for punishing mutiny and desertion, and for the better payment of the army and their quarters within this kingdom. (Repealed by Statute Law Revision (Ireland) Act 1879 (42 & 43 Vict. c. 24))
Roads from Dublin to Dunleer Act 1789	29 Geo. 3. c. 23 (I)	23 May 1789
An Act for amending the laws for improving and repairing the turnpike road from Dublin (Note: Dublin.) to Dunleer. (Note: Dunleer, County Louth.)
Roads in Dublin Act 1789	29 Geo. 3. c. 24 (I)	25 May 1789
An Act for rendering more effectual several acts, one passed in the 26th year of his majesty's reign entitled "An Act for making, widening and repairing the road leading from the city of Dublin to Malahide, and for erecting turnpike gates and receiving tolls thereout in aid of the barony presentments, and for appointing trustees for carrying the said purposes into execution," (Note: Dublin to Malahide Road Act 1786 (26 Geo. 3. c. 30 (I))) and the other passed in the 28th year of his majesty's reign (Note: Dublin to Clontarf Road Act 1788 (28 Geo. 3. c. 48 (I))) entitled "An Act for extending to the roads leading to Dublin through Raheny (Note: Raheny, Dublin.) and Clontarf (Note: Clontarf, Dublin.) the provisions of an act passed in the 26th year of his majesty's reign entitled 'An Act for making, widening and repairing the road leading from the city of Dublin to Malahide, (Note: Malahide, County Dublin.) and for erecting turnpike gates and receiving tolls thereout in aid of the barony presentments, and for appointing trustees for carrying the said purposes into execution.'"
Revenue Act 1789 (repealed)	29 Geo. 3. c. 25 (I)	25 May 1789
An Act for continuing and amending certain laws heretofore made concerning his majesty's revenue, and for the more effectually preventing of frauds therein. (Repealed by Statute Law Revision (Ireland) Act 1879 (42 & 43 Vict. c. 24))
First Fruits Act 1789 (repealed)	29 Geo. 3. c. 26 (I)	25 May 1789
An Act for better enforcing the payment of the first fruits chargeable on the clergy. (Repealed by Church Temporalities (Ireland) Act 1833 (3 & 4 Will. 4. c. 37))
Churches and Glebes Act 1789	29 Geo. 3. c. 27 (I)	25 May 1789
An Act for the better providing for the repairs of churches and the residence of the clergy.
Forfeited Recognizances Act 1789	29 Geo. 3. c. 28 (I)	25 May 1789
An Act for amending and explaining the provisions of an act entitled "An Act for the better collection of forfeited recognizances." (Note: Forfeited Recognizances Act 1787 (27 Geo. 3. c. 32 (I)))
Parliamentary Registration Act 1789	29 Geo. 3. c. 29 (I)	25 May 1789
An Act to continue an act entitled "An Act for the further amendment of the law relative to the registering of freeholders." (Note: Parliamentary Registration Act 1788 (28 Geo. 3. c. 33 (I)))
Commons Act 1789^{(Republic of Ireland)}	29 Geo. 3. c. 30 (I)	25 May 1789
An Act for preventing the commission of waste on the several commons in this kingdom.
Canal in Lough Neagh Act 1789	29 Geo. 3. c. 31 (I)	25 May 1789
An Act for promoting the linen manufacture in the several counties bordering on Lough Neagh, by making a communication between the said lough and the collieries of Drumglass in the county of Tyrone.
Oaths of Qualification (Indemnity) Act 1789 (repealed)	29 Geo. 3. c. 32 (I)	25 May 1789
An Act for the relief of persons who have omitted to qualify themselves according to law. (Repealed by Statute Law Revision (Ireland) Act 1879 (42 & 43 Vict. c. 24))
Inland Navigation Act 1789^{(Republic of Ireland)}	29 Geo. 3. c. 33 (I)	25 May 1789
An Act for the promotion and encouragement of inland navigation. (Repealed for the Republic of Ireland by Statute Law Revision (Pre-Union Irish Statutes) Act 1962 (No. 29))
Linen Manufacture Grant Act 1789	29 Geo. 3. c. 34 (I)	25 May 1789
An Act for granting the sum of £4,000 to the trustees of the linen manufacture and for other purposes.
Grant for Record Office and Law Courts Act 1789 (repealed)	29 Geo. 3. c. 35 (I)	25 May 1789
An Act for granting the sum of £6,000 to the lord chancellor and chief judges for the purposes therein mentioned. (Repealed by Statute Law Revision (Ireland) Act 1879 (42 & 43 Vict. c. 24))
Dublin Society Grant Act 1789 (repealed)	29 Geo. 3. c. 36 (I)	25 May 1789
An Act for granting the sum of £5,000 to the Dublin Society for the purposes therein mentioned. (Repealed by Statute Law Revision (Ireland) Act 1879 (42 & 43 Vict. c. 24))
Royal Exchange Duties Act 1789 (repealed)	29 Geo. 3. c. 37 (I)	25 May 1789
An Act for granting to his majesty the duties therein mentioned to be paid to the trustees of the Royal Exchange. (Repealed by Statute Law Revision (Ireland) Act 1879 (42 & 43 Vict. c. 24))
Duties on Spices Act 1789 (repealed)	29 Geo. 3. c. 38 (I)	25 May 1789
An Act to continue an act passed in the 23rd and 24th years of his present majesty entitled "An Act for regulating the import of cinnamon, cloves, mace and nutmegs, and for the better collecting the duties thereon." (Note: Spices Trade Act 1783 (23 & 24 Geo. 3. c. 25 (I))) (Repealed by Statute Law Revision (Ireland) Act 1879 (42 & 43 Vict. c. 24))
Grand Canal Act 1789	29 Geo. 3. c. 39 (I)	25 May 1789
An Act for amending an act entitled "An Act for enabling certain persons to carry on and complete the Grand Canal." (Note: Grand Canal Act 1771 (11 & 12 Geo. 3. c. 31 (I)))
Expiring Laws Continuance Act 1789 (repealed)	29 Geo. 3. c. 40 (I)	25 May 1789
An Act for reviving and continuing certain temporary statutes. (Repealed by Statute Law Revision (Ireland) Act 1879 (42 & 43 Vict. c. 24))
Pious and Charitable Purposes Act 1789 (repealed)	29 Geo. 3. c. 41 (I)	25 May 1789
An Act for granting the several sums therein mentioned for certain pious and charitable purposes. (Repealed by Statute Law Revision (Ireland) Act 1879 (42 & 43 Vict. c. 24))
Water Supply Act 1789	29 Geo. 3. c. 42 (I)	25 May 1789
An Act for the better supplying the Inhabitants of certain Cities and Towns with Water. (Repealed for the Republic of Ireland by Statute Law Revision (Pre-Union Irish Statutes) Act 1962 (No. 29))

=== Private acts ===
Short title, or popular name	Citation	Royal assent
Long title
Montgomery's Estate Act 1789	29 Geo. 3. c. 1 Pr. (I)	25 May 1789
An Act to enable the Right Honourable Robert, lord baron of Leitrim, the Right Honourable Theophilus Clements and Henry Clements, esquire, committees of George Montgomery of Ballyconnel in the county of Cavan, esquire, a lunatic, to make leases of the estate of the said lunatic.
Parnell's Estate Act 1789	29 Geo. 3. c. 2 Pr. (I)	25 May 1789
An Act for vesting the settled estate in the Queen's County, of the Right Honourable Sir John Parnell, in his second, third, fourth and fifth sons, in the same manner as if his eldest son John Parnell had been dead without issue male, and for providing a maintenance for the said John Parnell during his life.
Jackson's Will and Charities Act 1789	29 Geo. 3. c. 3 Pr. (I)	25 May 1789
An Act for confirming and establishing an agreement made between the trustees named in the last will of Richard Jackson, esquire, deceased, and the surviving devisees named in said will, and the heir at law, and widow of the said Richard Jackson, concerning the real and person estate of the said Richard Jackson, and for incorporating said trustees for the better execution of the charitable purposes appointed by the said will, and for other purposes.

=== Sources ===
- "Acts of Parliament by Session: 1789". Irish Legislation Database. Queen's University Belfast.

== 30 Geo. 3 (1790) ==
The 7th session of the 4th parliament of George III, which met from 21 January 1790 to 5 April 1790.

This session was also traditionally cited as 30 G. 3.

=== Public acts ===
Short title, or popular name	Citation	Royal assent
Long title
Import Duties and Prohibitions Act 1790 (repealed)	30 Geo. 3. c. 1 (I)	17 March 1790
An Act for granting unto His Majesty, His Heirs and Successors, an additional Duty on Wines, Hides, Beer, Ale, and other Goods and Merchandizes therein mentioned; and for prohibiting the Importation of all Gold and Silver Lace, except of the Manufacture of Great Britain; and of all Cambricks, Lawns, and Glass, except the Manufacture of Great Britain, and France, and the French Dominions in Europe; and of all Hops, except of the Growth of Great Britain, and the British Plantations. (Repealed by Statute Law Revision (Ireland) Act 1879 (42 & 43 Vict. c. 24))
Government Loans and Duties Act 1790 (repealed)	30 Geo. 3. c. 2 (I)	17 March 1790
An Act for granting to His Majesty, the several Aids, Duties, Rates, Impositions and Taxes therein particularly expressed, to be applied to the Payment of the Interest of the principal Sums therein provided for, and towards the Discharge of such principal Sums, in such Manner as therein is directed; and for such other Purposes as are therein mentioned. (Repealed by Statute Law Revision (Ireland) Act 1879 (42 & 43 Vict. c. 24))
Trade Advancement and Duties Act 1790 (repealed)	30 Geo. 3. c. 3 (I)	17 March 1790
An Act for the Advancement of Trade, and for granting to His Majesty, His Heirs and Successors, the several Duties therein mentioned. (Repealed by Statute Law Revision (Ireland) Act 1879 (42 & 43 Vict. c. 24))
Sugar Trade Regulation Act 1790 (repealed)	30 Geo. 3. c. 4 (I)	17 March 1790
An Act for regulating the Sugar Trade, and for granting to His Majesty, His Heirs and Successors, the Duties therein mentioned. (Repealed by Statute Law Revision (Ireland) Act 1879 (42 & 43 Vict. c. 24))
Coffee Trade Regulation Act 1790 (repealed)	30 Geo. 3. c. 5 (I)	17 March 1790
An Act for regulating the Coffee Trade, and for granting to His Majesty, His Heirs and Successors, the several Duties therein mentioned upon Coffee. (Repealed by Statute Law Revision (Ireland) Act 1879 (42 & 43 Vict. c. 24))
Malt Duties Act 1790 (repealed)	30 Geo. 3. c. 6 (I)	17 March 1790
An Act for granting unto His Majesty, His Heirs and Successors, certain Duties upon Malt. (Repealed by Statute Law Revision (Ireland) Act 1879 (42 & 43 Vict. c. 24))
Aids and Duties Act 1790 (repealed)	30 Geo. 3. c. 7 (I)	17 March 1790
An Act for granting certain Aids, Duties, and Impositions, to His Majesty, His Heirs and Successors, for the Time therein mentioned, and for continuing the Effect of a Treaty of Commerce and Navigation concluded between His Majesty and the Most Christian King. (Note: 'Most Christian King' is a reference to the King of France.) (Repealed by Statute Law Revision (Ireland) Act 1879 (42 & 43 Vict. c. 24))
Linen and Hempen Manufacture Act 1790 (repealed)	30 Geo. 3. c. 8 (I)	17 March 1790
An Act to promote the Linen and Hempen Manufacture, by encreasing the Supply of Irish Flax-seed, and encouraging the Export of Linens and Sail-Cloth, and for granting to His Majesty, His Heirs and Successors, the Duties therein mentioned. (Repealed by Statute Law Revision (Ireland) Act 1879 (42 & 43 Vict. c. 24))
Coroners' Presentments Act 1790 (repealed)	30 Geo. 3. c. 9 (I)	5 April 1790
An Act to enable Grand Juries to present for Coroners as therein mentioned, instead of the Sums which they are now by Law empowered to present. (Repealed by Statute Law Revision (Ireland) Act 1879 (42 & 43 Vict. c. 24))
Carriage Duties Act 1790 (repealed)	30 Geo. 3. c. 10 (I)	17 March 1790
An Act for granting unto His Majesty, His Heirs and Successors, certain Duties upon Carriages. (Repealed by Statute Law Revision (Ireland) Act 1879 (42 & 43 Vict. c. 24))
Licence Duties Act 1790 (repealed)	30 Geo. 3. c. 11 (I)	17 March 1790
An Act for granting certain Duties upon Licenses, to be taken out by the several Persons therein mentioned. (Repealed by Statute Law Revision (Ireland) Act 1879 (42 & 43 Vict. c. 24))
Tobacco Duties Act 1790 (repealed)	30 Geo. 3. c. 12 (I)	17 March 1790
An Act for regulating and extending the Tobacco Trade, and for granting to His Majesty, His Heirs and Successors, the Duties therein mentioned. (Repealed by Statute Law Revision (Ireland) Act 1879 (42 & 43 Vict. c. 24))
Trade with United States Act 1790 (repealed)	30 Geo. 3. c. 13 (I)	17 March 1790
An Act for further continuing an Act, entitled, "An Act for facilitating the Trade and Intercourse between this Kingdom and the United States of America." (Note: Trade with United States Act 1788 (28 Geo. 3. c. 18 (I))) (Repealed by Statute Law Revision (Ireland) Act 1879 (42 & 43 Vict. c. 24))
Hawkers and Pedlars Licences Act 1790 (repealed)	30 Geo. 3. c. 14 (I)	17 March 1790
An Act for licensing Hawkers and Pedlars, Petty Chapmen, and other Persons. (Repealed by Statute Law Revision (Ireland) Act 1879 (42 & 43 Vict. c. 24))
Postage Act 1790 (repealed)	30 Geo. 3. c. 15 (I)	17 March 1790
An Act for granting to His Majesty, His Heirs and Successors, certain Duties and Rates upon the Portage and Conveyance of all Letters and Packets within this Kingdom. (Repealed by Statute Law Revision (Ireland) Act 1879 (42 & 43 Vict. c. 24))
Stamp Act 1790 (repealed)	30 Geo. 3. c. 16 (I)	17 March 1790
An Act for granting to His Majesty, His Heirs and Successors, several Duties therein mentioned, to be levied by the Commissioners for managing the Stamp Duties. (Repealed by Statute Law Revision (Ireland) Act 1879 (42 & 43 Vict. c. 24))
Parliamentary Registration Act 1790	30 Geo. 3. c. 17 (I)	17 March 1790
An Act to continue the Effect of an Act, Entitled, "An Act for the further Amendment of the Law relative to the Registering of Freeholders." (Note: Parliamentary Registration Act 1788 (28 Geo. 3. c. 33 (I)))
Mutiny Act (Ireland) 1790 (repealed)	30 Geo. 3. c. 18 (I)	17 March 1790
An Act for punishing Mutiny and Desertion, and for the better Payment of the Army and their Quarters within this Kingdom. (Repealed by Statute Law Revision (Ireland) Act 1879 (42 & 43 Vict. c. 24))
Road to Mullingar Act 1790	30 Geo. 3. c. 19 (I)	5 April 1790
An Act for further amending an Act, Entitled, (Note: Dublin Improvement Act 1783 (23 & 24 Geo. 3. c. 31 (I))) "An Act for continuing and amending an Act passed in the Twenty-second Year of His present Majesty's Reign, (Note: Dublin Improvement and Coal Trade Act 1781 (21 & 22 Geo. 3. c. 17 (I))) Entitled, 'An Act for the Improvement of the City of Dublin, by making wide and convenient Passages through the same, and for regulating the Coal Trade thereof,' and for other Purposes.'"
Royal Canal Act 1790	30 Geo. 3. c. 20 (I)	5 April 1790
An Act for the better enabling the Royal Canal Company to carry on and compleat the Royal Canal from the City of Dublin to Tarmonbury on the River Shannon.
Indemnity Act (Ireland) 1790 (repealed)	30 Geo. 3. c. 21 (I)	5 April 1790
An Act for the Relief of Persons who have omitted to qualify themselves according to Law. (Repealed by Statute Law Revision (Ireland) Act 1879 (42 & 43 Vict. c. 24))
Revenue Act 1790 (repealed)	30 Geo. 3. c. 22 (I)	5 April 1790
An Act for continuing and amending several Laws relating to His Majesty's Revenue, and for the more effectually preventing of Frauds therein, and for other Purposes therein mentioned. (Repealed by Statute Law Revision (Ireland) Act 1879 (42 & 43 Vict. c. 24))
Bankruptcy Act 1790	30 Geo. 3. c. 23 (I)	5 April 1790
An Act to repeal certain Clauses in an Act passed in the Seventeenth and Eighteenth Years of His Majesty's Reign, Entitled, "An Act to prevent Frauds committed by Bankrupts, who do not keep regular Books of Account," (Note: Bankrupts Act 1777 (17 & 18 Geo. 3. c. 48 (I))) and for continuing the said Law, and other Purposes.
Sea Fisheries Act 1790 (repealed)	30 Geo. 3. c. 24 (I)	5 April 1790
An Act to continue an Act, (Note: Sea Fisheries Act 1786 (26 Geo. 3. c. 20 (I))) Entitled, "An Act to amend an Act, (Note: Sea Fisheries Act 1785 (25 Geo. 3. c. 35 (I))) Entitled, 'An Act for the further Improvement and Extension of the Fisheries on the Coasts of his Kingdom.'" (Repealed by Statute Law Revision (Ireland) Act 1879 (42 & 43 Vict. c. 24))
Pilots Act 1790	30 Geo. 3. c. 25 (I)	5 April 1790
An Act to amend an Act, Entitled, "An Act for promoting the Improvement of Ports and Harbours in this Kingdom." (Note: Pilots Act 1787 (27 Geo. 3. c. 25 (I))) (Repealed for the Republic of Ireland by Statute Law Revision (Pre-Union Irish Statutes) Act 1962 (No. 29))
Bounties on Linen Act 1790	30 Geo. 3. c. 26 (I)	5 April 1790
An Act for granting the Sum of Four Thousand Pounds to the Trustees of the Linen Manufacture, and for other Purposes.
Rotunda Hospital Grant Act 1790	30 Geo. 3. c. 27 (I)	5 April 1790
An Act for granting the several Sums therein mentioned, for certain Pious and Charitable Purposes.
Agriculture and Manufactures Grants Act 1790 (repealed)	30 Geo. 3. c. 28 (I)	5 April 1790
An Act for granting the Sum of Five Thousand Pounds to the Dublin Society, for the Purposes therein mentioned. (Repealed by Statute Law Revision (Ireland) Act 1879 (42 & 43 Vict. c. 24))
Guardianship of Infants Act 1790 (repealed)	30 Geo. 3. c. 29 (I)	17 March 1790
An Act to explain and amend an Act passed in the Fourteenth and Fifteenth Years of the Reign of King Charles the Second, Entitled, "An Act for taking away the Court of Wards and Liveries, and Tenures in Capite, and by Knights Service;" (Note: Tenures Abolition Act 1662 (14 & 15 Chas. 2 Sess. 4. c. 19 (I))) and also an Act passed in the Twenty-first and Twenty-second Years of His present Majesty's Reign, Entitled, "An Act to allow Persons professing the Popish Religion to teach School in this Kingdom, and for regulating the Education of Papists," (Note: Roman Catholic Relief Act 1781 (21 & 22 Geo. 3. c. 62 (I))) and also to repeal Part of certain Laws relative to the Guardianship of their Children. (Repealed by Statute Law Revision (Ireland) Act 1879 (42 & 43 Vict. c. 24))
Corn Trade Amendment Act 1790 (repealed)	30 Geo. 3. c. 30 (I)	5 April 1790
An Act to amend an Act passed in the Twenty-third and Twenty-fourth Years of His Majesty's Reign, Entitled, "An Act for regulating the Corn Trade, promoting Agriculture, and providing a regular and steady Supply of Corn in the Kingdom." (Note: Corn Trade and Agriculture Act 1783 (23 & 24 Geo. 3. c. 19 (I))) (Repealed by Statute Law Revision (Ireland) Act 1879 (42 & 43 Vict. c. 24))
Londonderry Bridge Act 1790	30 Geo. 3. c. 31 (I)	5 April 1790
An Act for building a Bridge over the River Loughfoyle, at the City of Londonderry, and the Suburbs thereof, and for certain Regulations relative to said City.
Transportation Act 1790 (repealed)	30 Geo. 3. c. 32 (I)	5 April 1790
An Act for rendering the Transportation of Felons and Vagabonds more easy. (Repealed by Statute Law Revision (Ireland) Act 1879 (42 & 43 Vict. c. 24))
Dublin Port Duties Act 1790 (repealed)	30 Geo. 3. c. 33 (I)	5 April 1790
An Act for granting to His Majesty, the Duty therein mentioned, to be paid to the Trustees of the Royal Exchange. (Repealed by Statute Law Revision (Ireland) Act 1879 (42 & 43 Vict. c. 24))
Endowed Schools Commission Continuance Act 1790 (repealed)	30 Geo. 3. c. 34 (I)	5 April 1790
An Act to continue an Act, Entitled, "An Act to enable the Lord Lieutenant, or other Chief Governor or Governors of this Kingdom, to appoint Commissioners for enquiring into the several Funds and Revenues granted by public or private Donations for the Purposes of Education in this Kingdom, and into the State and Condition of all Schools in this Kingdom on public or charitable Foundations, and of the Funds appropriated for the Maintenance and Support thereof, and for the other Purposes herein mentioned." (Note: Endowed Schools Commission Act 1788 (28 Geo. 3. c. 15 (I))) (Repealed by Statute Law Revision (Ireland) Act 1879 (42 & 43 Vict. c. 24))
Peace Preservation Act Continuance Act 1790 (repealed)	30 Geo. 3. c. 35 (I)	5 April 1790
An Act to continue an Act passed in the Twenty-seventh Year of the Reign of His Present Majesty, Entitled, "An Act for the better Execution of the Law, and Preservation of the Peace within Counties at Large." (Note: Peace Preservation Act 1787 (27 Geo. 3. c. 40 (I))) (Repealed by Statute Law Revision (Ireland) Act 1879 (42 & 43 Vict. c. 24))
Charitable Foundation Borrowing Act 1790 (repealed)	30 Geo. 3. c. 36 (I)	5 April 1790
An Act for enabling Trustees of Charitable Foundations to promote the Purposes and extend the Benefit of the same. (Repealed by Statute Law Revision (Ireland) Act 1879 (42 & 43 Vict. c. 24))
Inland Navigation Act 1790	30 Geo. 3. c. 37 (I)	5 April 1790
An Act to explain and amend an Act passed in the Twenty-ninth Year of the Reign of His present Majesty, Entitled, "An Act for the Promotion and Encouragement of Inland Navigation." (Note: Inland Navigation Act 1789 (29 Geo. 3. c. 33 (I))) (Repealed for the Republic of Ireland by Statute Law Revision (Pre-Union Irish Statutes) Act 1962 (No. 29))
Road in Tipperary and Kilkenny Act 1790	30 Geo. 3. c. 38 (I)	5 April 1790
An Act to repeal an Act passed in the Twenty-fifth Year of the Reign of His late Majesty King George the Second, Entitled, An Act for repairing the Road leading from the Town of Clonmell in the County of Tipperary, through the Towns of Feathard and Killinall in the said County, to the Town of Hurlingford in the County of Kilkenny.
Port of Drogheda Act 1790^{(Republic of Ireland)} or the Borough of Drogheda Act 1790	30 Geo. 3. c. 39 (I)	5 April 1790
An Act for the Improvement of the Port and Harbour of Drogheda, and the better Regulation of the Police of said Town.
Boyne Navigation Act 1790^{(Republic of Ireland)}	30 Geo. 3. c. 40 (I)	5 April 1790
An Act to explain and amend an Act passed in the Twenty-ninth Year of His Majesty's Reign, Entitled, "An Act for the Promotion and Encouragement of Inland Navigation, to far only as respects the Navigation of the Baylie." (Note: Inland Navigation Act 1789 (29 Geo. 3. c. 33 (I)))
Funds in Chancery Act 1790 (repealed)	30 Geo. 3. c. 41 (I)	5 April 1790
An Act for enabling the Lord High Chancellor, and the Court of Exchequer respectively, to make Orders on the Governor and Company of the Bank of Ireland for Payment, out of the general Fund of Monies belonging to the Suitors of the Courts of Chancery and Exchequer, the Sum therein mentioned, towards building the principal Courts of Justice at Dublin, and Law Offices, and for amending an Act, Entitled, "An Act for better securing the Monies and Effects of the Suitors of the Court of Chancery and Court of Exchequer, by depositing the same in the National Bank, and to prevent the forging and counterfeiting any Draft, Order, or other Voucher, for the Payment or Delivery of such Money or Effects, and for other Purposes." (Note: Funds in Chancery Act 1783 (23 & 24 Geo. 3. c. 22 (I))) (Repealed for the Republic of Ireland by Statute Law Revision (Pre-Union Irish Statutes) Act 1962 (No. 29) and for Northern Ireland by the Statute Law Revision Act 1950 (14 Geo. 6. c. 6))
Dublin Streets Act 1790	30 Geo. 3. c. 42 (I)	5 April 1790
An Act for extending the Powers of the Corporation for paving, cleansing, and lighting the Streets of Dublin, and to enable the said Corporation to build a Bridge across the River Anna Liffey, at Island Bridge.
Down Cathedral Act 1790	30 Geo. 3. c. 43 (I)	5 April 1790
An Act for the more effectual Application of the Sum of One Thousand Pounds, granted by King's Letter, for the Support and Repair of the Cathedral Church of Down, and for defraying the Expences of the Celebration of Divine Worship therein.
Road in Kilkenny and Tipperary Act 1790	30 Geo. 3. c. 44 (I)	5 April 1790
An Act for the Amendment of the Turnpike Road leading from the City of Kilkenny to the Town of Clonmell, and thence to the Bounds of the County of Cork, and to provide for the better Repair of the said Road.
Expiring Laws Continuance Act 1790 (repealed)	30 Geo. 3. c. 45 (I)	5 April 1790
An Act for reviving and continuing several Temporary Statutes. (Repealed by Statute Law Revision (Ireland) Act 1879 (42 & 43 Vict. c. 24))
Road in Westmeath Act 1790	30 Geo. 3. c. 46 (I)	5 April 1790
An Act for improving and repairing the Turnpike Road leading from Kinnegad to Athlone.
Road from Limerick to Cork Act 1790	30 Geo. 3. c. 47 (I)	5 April 1790
An Act for continuing and amending the several Acts for making, widening, and repairing so much of the Road leading from the City of Limerick to the City of Cork, as lies within the County of County of the City of Cork, that is to say, from the Bounds of the Counties of Limerick and Cork, between the Towns of Kilmallock and Charlesville to the City of Cork, and to continue an Act, passed in the Twenty-eighth Year of His present Majesty, (Note: Newcastle, Limerick, and Cork Road Act 1788 (28 Geo. 3. c. 28 (I))) Entitled, "An Act to continue and amend an Act passed in the Fifth Year of His late Majesty's Reign, (Note: Newcastle, Limerick, and Cork Road Act 1731 (5 Geo. 2. c. 22 (I))) Entitled, 'An Act for repairing the Road leading from the Town of Newcastle, in the County of Limerick, to the City of Limerick, and from thence to the City of Cork.'"

=== Private acts ===
Short title, or popular name	Citation	Royal assent
Long title
Joshua's Estate Act 1790	30 Geo. 3. c. 1 Pr. (I)	5 April 1790
An Act to amend an act, entitled, "An Act enabling the Right Honourable John Joshua, then lord baron Carysfort, to make long leases of his estate in the county of Dublin, and part of his estate in the county of Wicklow." (Note: Lord Carysfort's Estate Act 1783 (23 & 24 Geo. 3. c. 12 Pr. (I)))
Viscount Conyngham's Estate Act 1790	30 Geo. 3. c. 2 Pr. (I)	5 April 1790
An Act for vesting in trustees the settled estate of Henry, Lord Viscount Conyngham, situate in the county of Limerick, to be sold or mortgaged for the payment of an encumbrance of £12,000 sterling affecting the same, and for payment of the portion provided for the younger children of Francis Pierpoint, late Lord Baron Conyngham, by Elizabeth, Lady Conyngham, his wife, charged on the unsettled estates of the said Henry, Lord Viscount Conyngham, in the said county of Clare and for settling a competent part of the unsettled estate of the said Henry, Lord Viscount Conyngham, in the county of Clare, in lieu of the said estate in the county of Limerick so to be sold or mortgaged as aforesaid, and for other purposes.
Barrington's Estate Act 1790	30 Geo. 3. c. 3 Pr. (I)	5 April 1790
An Act for vesting several towns, lands, tenements and hereditaments situate in the Queen's County and county of Kilkenny, the estate of John Barrington, esquire, in trustees for securing a jointure thereon for Alice Barrington, the wife of the said John Barrington, and for the payment of debts and encumbrances affecting the same estates, and for other purposes.
Lindsey's Estate Act 1790	30 Geo. 3. c. 4 Pr. (I)	5 April 1790
An Act for vesting in trustees certain real and freehold lands, tenements and hereditaments situate in the county of Mayo and Roscommon, the estates of Thomas Bucknall Lindsey of Huntingdon in the county of Mayo, esquire, in order to be sold or mortgaged for the payment of debts, charges and encumbrances affecting same, and for other purposes.

=== Sources ===
- "Acts of Parliament by Session: 1790A". Irish Legislation Database. Queen's University Belfast.
- "Pre-Union Irish Statutes: 1790 Acts". Irish Statute Book. Attorney General of Ireland.

== 30 Geo. 3 Sess. 2 (1790) ==
The 1st session of the 5th parliament of George III, which met from 2 July 1700 to 24 July 1790.

This session was also traditionally cited as 30 Geo. 3. sess. 2, 30 G. 3. Sess. 2 or 30 G. 3. sess. 2.

There were no private acts passed in this session.

=== Public acts ===
Short title, or popular name	Citation	Royal assent
Long title
Indemnity (No. 2) Act (Ireland) 1790 (repealed)	30 Geo. 3 Sess. 2. c. 1 (I)	24 July 1790
An Act for continuing an Act passed in the Thirtieth Year of His present Majesty, Entitled, "An Act for the Relief of Persons who have omitted to Qualify themselves according to Law." (Note: Indemnity Act (Ireland) 1790 (30 Geo. 3. c. 21 (I))) (Repealed by Statute Law Revision (Ireland) Act 1879 (42 & 43 Vict. c. 24))

=== Sources ===
- "Acts of Parliament by Session: 1790B". Irish Legislation Database. Queen's University Belfast.

== See also ==
- List of acts of the Parliament of Ireland
- List of acts of the Oireachtas
- List of legislation in the United Kingdom
