= Irish Appeals Act 1783 =

Act of the Parliament of Great Britain

- Act of Parliament
- Parliament of Great Britain
- Long title: An act for removing and preventing all doubts which have arisen, or might arise, concerning the exclusive rights of the parliament and courts of Ireland, in matters of legislation and judicature; and for preventing any writ of error or appeal from any of his Majesty’s courts in that kingdom from being received, heard, and adjudged in any of his Majesty’s courts in the kingdom of Great Britain.
- Citation: 23 Geo. 3. c. 28

Dates
- Royal assent: 17 April 1783
- Commencement: 5 December 1782 (Note: Start of session.)
- Repealed: 3 July 1962
Other legislation
Amended by	Statute Law Revision Act 1871; Statute Law Revision Act 1888; Statute Law Revision Act 1953
Repealed by	Northern Ireland Act 1962
Relates to	Declaratory Act 1719; Repeal of Act for Securing Dependence of Ireland Act 1782

Status: Repealed

Text of statute as originally enacted

The Irish Appeals Act 1783 (23 Geo. 3. c. 28), commonly known as the Renunciation Act, was an act of the Parliament of Great Britain. By it the British Parliament renounced all right to legislate for Ireland, and declared that no appeal from the decision of any court in Ireland could be heard in any court in Great Britain.

== Background ==
The Declaratory Act 1719 (6 Geo. 1. c. 5) declared that the king and parliament of Great Britain had "full power and authority to make laws and statutes of sufficient validity to bind the Kingdom and people of Ireland", and that the Irish House of Lords had no power to hear appeals from Irish courts. This was greatly resented by the Irish parliament. In the early 1780s, the combination of political pressure from individuals such as Henry Grattan and Henry Flood and the conventions of the Irish Volunteers, at a time when Britain was involved in the American Revolutionary War, led to the passing of the Repeal Act 1782 (22 Geo. 3. c. 53), which granted legislative independence to the Kingdom of Ireland. A small number of Irish politicians believed that repeal of the act did not imply that the British parliament could not assume the right to legislate for Ireland. As W. E. H. Lecky put it, "the Declaratory Act had not made the right, and therefore its repeal could not destroy it." Flood became convinced that it was necessary that the British parliament pass an act specifically renouncing any right to legislate for Ireland. Initially, the majority of the Irish parliament, including Grattan, opposed such a move. Later that year, however, Lord Mansfield heard an appeal from an Irish court in the English King's Bench. This had the effect of strengthening Flood's hand, and the result was the passage, on 17 April 1783, of the Renunciation Act.

== Provisions ==
The act contained two sections. The first declared:

that the said right claimed by the people of Ireland, to be bound only by laws enacted by his majesty and the parliament of that kingdom, in all cases whatever, and to have all actions and suits at law or in equity, which may be instituted in that kingdom, decided in his majesty's courts therein finally, and without appeal from thence, shall be, and is hereby declared to be established and ascertained for ever, and shall at no time hereafter be questioned or questionable.

The second dealt specifically with the right of appeal:

that no writ of error or appeal shall be received or adjudged, or any other proceeding be had, by or in any of his majesty's courts in this kingdom in any action or suit at law or in equity instituted in any of his majesty's courts in the kingdom of Ireland.

The statute did not state that appeals from Irish courts lay with the Irish House of Lords, but in practice the Irish House of Lords took on this function.

== Subsequent developments ==
The Act of Union 1800 abolished the Irish parliament, and thus ended legislative independence. That act did not repeal the act, and even the Statute Law Revision Act 1871 (34 & 35 Vict. c. 116) repealed only a few short sentences at the end of section 2 relating to records of proceedings before 1782. Indeed, the act was still on the statute books when the Short Titles Act 1896 was passed.

Some words were repealed by the Statute Law Revision Act 1953 (2 & 3 Eliz. 2. c. 5). The whole act was repealed by section 30(2) of, and part IV of schedule four to, the Northern Ireland Act 1962 (10 & 11 Eliz. 2. c. 30).
