= Repeal of Act for Securing Dependence of Ireland Act 1782 =

Act of the Parliament of Great Britain

- Act of Parliament
- Parliament of Great Britain
- Long title: An Act to repeal an Act, made in the Sixth Year of the Reign of His late Majesty King George the First, intituled An Act for the better securing the Dependency of the Kingdom of Ireland upon the Crown of Great Britain.
- Citation: 22 Geo. 3. c. 53
- Territorial extent: Great Britain

Dates
- Royal assent: 21 June 1782
- Commencement: 21 June 1782 (Note: Section 1.)
- Repealed: 21 August 1871

Other legislation
- Repeals/revokes: Declaratory Act 1719
- Repealed by: Statute Law Revision Act 1871
- Relates to: Irish Appeals Act 1783

Status: Repealed

Text of statute as originally enacted

The Repeal Act 1782 (22 Geo. 3. c. 53) was an act of the Parliament of Great Britain, which repealed the Declaratory Act 1719 (6 Geo. 1. c. 5). The 1719 act had declared the Parliament of Ireland dependent on the Parliament and Privy Council of Great Britain; the Repeal Act was the first part of the Constitution of 1782, which granted legislative independence to the Kingdom of Ireland. It was passed after the resignation of the North Ministry, which had overseen defeat in the American War of Independence. The Irish Patriot Party and Irish Volunteers had demanded greater autonomy, and the new Rockingham Ministry conceded in fear of an American-style revolt. The Irish Parliament subsequently passed Yelverton's Act to amend Poynings' Law, the Irish statute which had given the British (and before that the English) Privy Council advance oversight over legislation to be proposed to the Irish Parliament.

While Henry Grattan was satisfied with the 1782 repeal, Henry Flood demanded further that Britain positively renounce any right to legislate for Ireland; this was secured by the Irish Appeals Act 1783 (23 Geo. 3. c. 28) (or "Renunciation Act").

== Subsequent developments ==
The whole act was repealed by section 1 of, and the schedule to, the Statute Law Revision Act 1871 (34 & 35 Vict. c. 116), which came into force on 21 August 1871.

== Bibliography ==
- The Law & Working of the Constitution: Documents 1660-1914, ed. W. C. Costin & J. Steven Watson. A&C Black, 1952. Vol. I (1660-1783).
- Horn, David Bayne; Ransome, Mary (1996). Early modern, 1714-1783. English Historical Documents. Vol. 7. series ed. David Charles Douglas. London: Routledge. ISBN 9780415143721. OCLC 60197798.
- Lecky, William Edward Hartpole (1913). A history of Ireland in the eighteenth century. Vol. 2. London: Longman Green & Co.
