= Irish House of Lords =

Upper house of the Parliament of Ireland that existed until 1800

Type
- Type: Upper house

History
- Established: 1297
- Disbanded: 1 January 1801
- Succeeded by: House of Lords of the United Kingdom

Leadership
- Lord Chancellor: The Earl of Clare^{1} (1789–1800)

Structure
- Seats: typically 122–147 in the 18th century 54 in 1689
- Length of term: Lifetime
- Salary: nil

Elections
- Voting system: Ennoblement by the monarch; Inheritance of an Irish peerage; Receiving a writ of acceleration (as heir apparent to a father who held two or more Irish peerages); Appointment to an Irish see

Meeting place
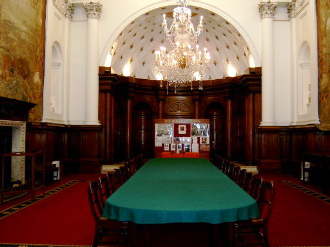
- Lords Chamber, Parliament House, Dublin

Footnotes
- ^{1}In 1800 See also: Parliament of Great Britain

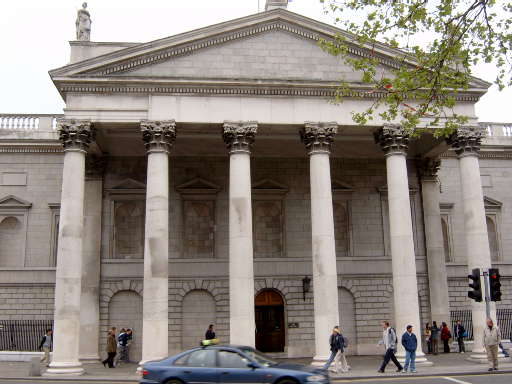
The House of Lords entrance to the Parliament House (east view). The entrance, which was part of an extension to the original building, was designed by renowned architect James Gandon by 1789.

The Irish House of Lords, known formally as The Lords Spiritual and Temporal in Parliament Assembled, was the upper house of the Parliament of Ireland that existed from medieval times until the end of 1800. It was also the final court of appeal of the Kingdom of Ireland.

It was modelled on the House of Lords of England, with members of the Peerage of Ireland sitting in the Irish Lords, just as members of the Peerage of England did at Westminster. When the Act of Union 1800 abolished the Irish parliament, a subset of Irish peers sat as Irish representative peers in the House of Lords of the merged Parliament of the United Kingdom.

== History ==
The Lords started as a group of barons in the Lordship of Ireland that was generally limited to the Pale, a variable area around Dublin where English law was in effect, but did extend to the rest of Ireland. They sat as a group, not as a separate House, from the first meeting of the Parliament of Ireland in 1297. From the establishment of the Kingdom of Ireland in 1542 the Lords included a large number of new Gaelic and Norman lords under the policy of surrender and regrant. As in England, Catholic bishops and archbishops sat in the house as "Lords Spiritual"; after the Reformation (1530s–40s) they were replaced by Church of Ireland churchmen. There were typically 22 Lords Spiritual: the four archbishops and eighteen diocesan bishops.

Religious division was reflected in the House, but as late as the 1689 "Patriot Parliament" a majority of Lords had remained Roman Catholics, while the administration and a slight majority in the Commons were Anglicans, adherents of the Church of Ireland. In 1634 the campaign to secure "The Graces" came to a head. Most of these Catholic lords lost their titles in the ensuing 1641 rebellion, notably during the 1652 Cromwellian Settlement. These dispossessed lords were regranted their titles (if not always their lands) after the Restoration of 1660 by the Act of Settlement 1662. Others took the losing side in the Williamite War in Ireland (1689–91), and a much smaller number of them were re-granted their lands in the 18th century.

By the 1790s most of the Lords personified and wanted to protect the "Protestant Ascendancy". By the time of the abolition of the Irish House of Lords in 1800 some of the peerages were very ancient, such as the lords Kingsale, created in 1397, and the viscounts Gormanston from 1478. The first Earl of Kildare had been created in 1316.

Following the Act of Union in 1800, the peerage of Ireland elected just 28 of their number to sit in the United Kingdom House of Lords, described as the "Irish representative peers". This practice ended in 1922 with the establishment of the Irish Free State. Other newly created Irish peers, such as Clive of India, the Earl of Carysfort and Lord Curzon, were still able to stand for election to the House of Commons of the United Kingdom (not being UK peers) if they were not a representative peer. This was a convenient way of giving a title for reasons of prestige to someone who expected to sit in the British House of Commons.

Today the 18th-century Irish Parliament building on College Green in Dublin is an office of the commercial Bank of Ireland, and visitors can view the Irish House of Lords chamber within the building.

== Function ==
The Parliament of Ireland was a bicameral legislature, and bills could originate in either the Commons or the Lords; both had to pass a bill for it to stand a chance of becoming law. Either house could amend or reject the others' proposals. Under Poynings' Law, matters passed by the Irish parliament had to be approved and could be amended by the Irish Privy Council and English Privy Council; main debates before this stage were thus technically on "heads of bills". Following approval the Parliament of Ireland voted on the formal finalised "bill" (which could only be rejected or passed unamended).

The Lords was the highest court of appeal in Ireland, same as the Lords were in England. However, the controversial British Declaratory Act 1719 asserted the right of the Lords in Westminster to overrule the Irish Lords. The Irish Patriot Party secured the repeal of the Declaratory Act as part of the Constitution of 1782.

The House of Lords was presided over by the Lord Chancellor, who sat on the woolsack, a large seat stuffed with wool from each of the three lands of England, Ireland and Scotland. At the state opening of the Irish parliament Members of Parliament were summoned to the House of Lords from the House of Commons chamber by Black Rod, a royal official who would "command the members on behalf of His Excellency to attend him in the chamber of peers". Sessions were formally opened by the Speech from the Throne by the Lord Lieutenant, who sat on the throne beneath a canopy of crimson velvet.

Sessions were generally held at Dublin Castle in the 16th and 17th centuries, until the opening of the Irish Houses of Parliament in the 1730s.

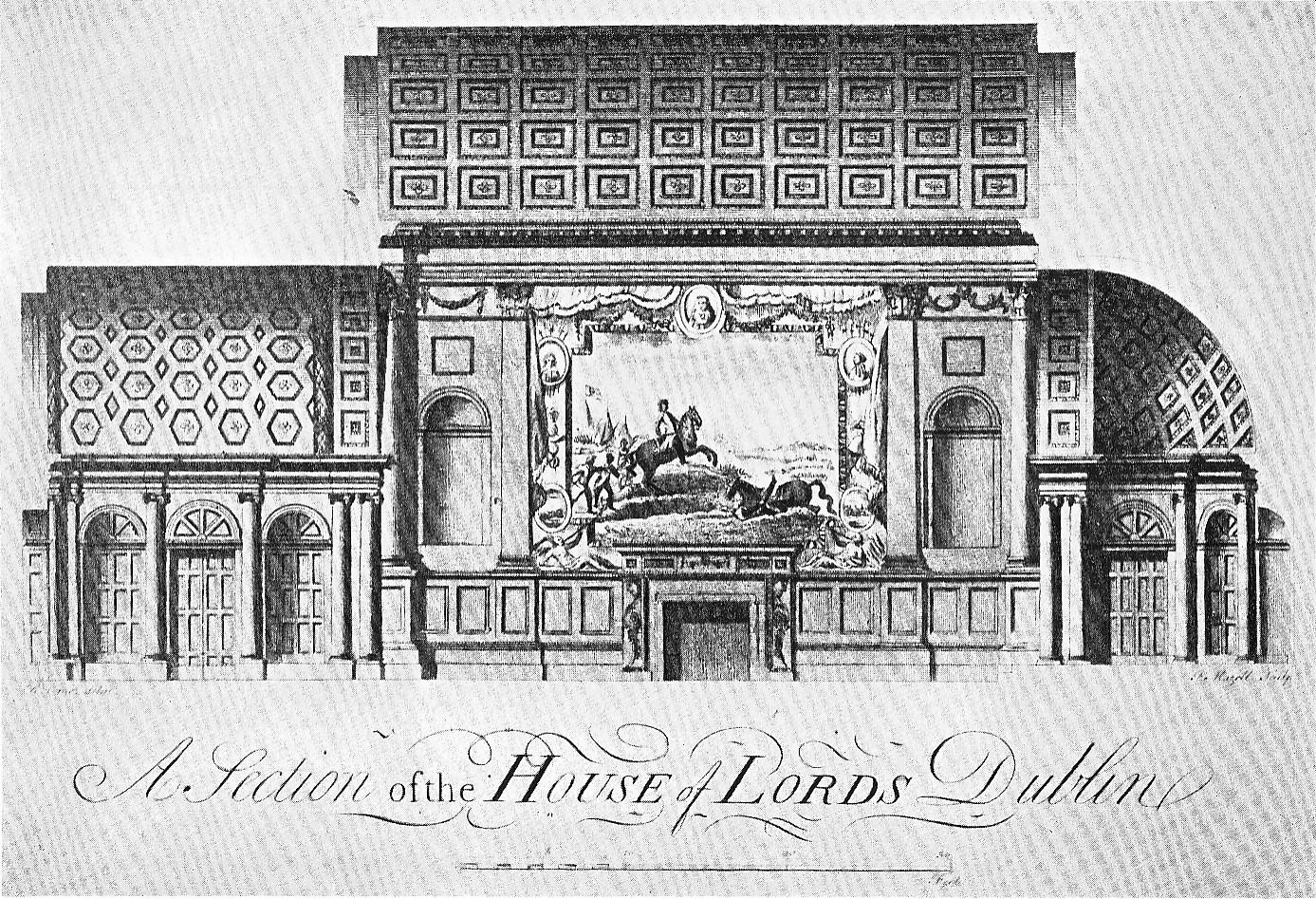
A sectional engraving of the House of Lords chamber (by Peter Mazell 1767 based on the drawing by Rowland Omer)

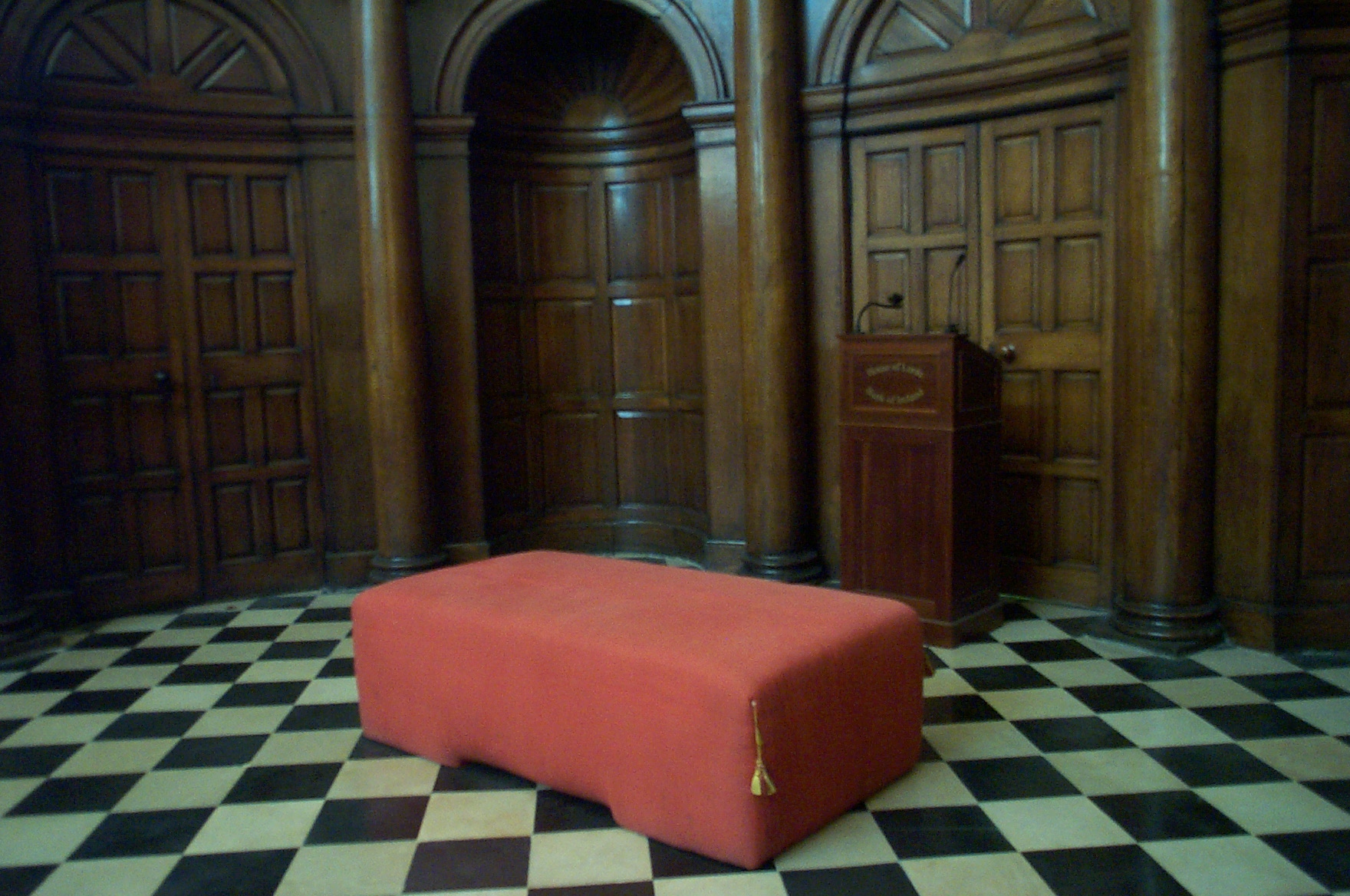
The Woolsack was used by the Lord Chancellor when chairing the house

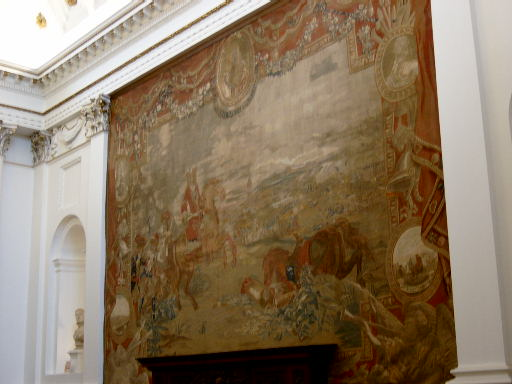
William III's victory over James II/VII
The Battle of the Boyne tapestry that hangs in the Lords chamber

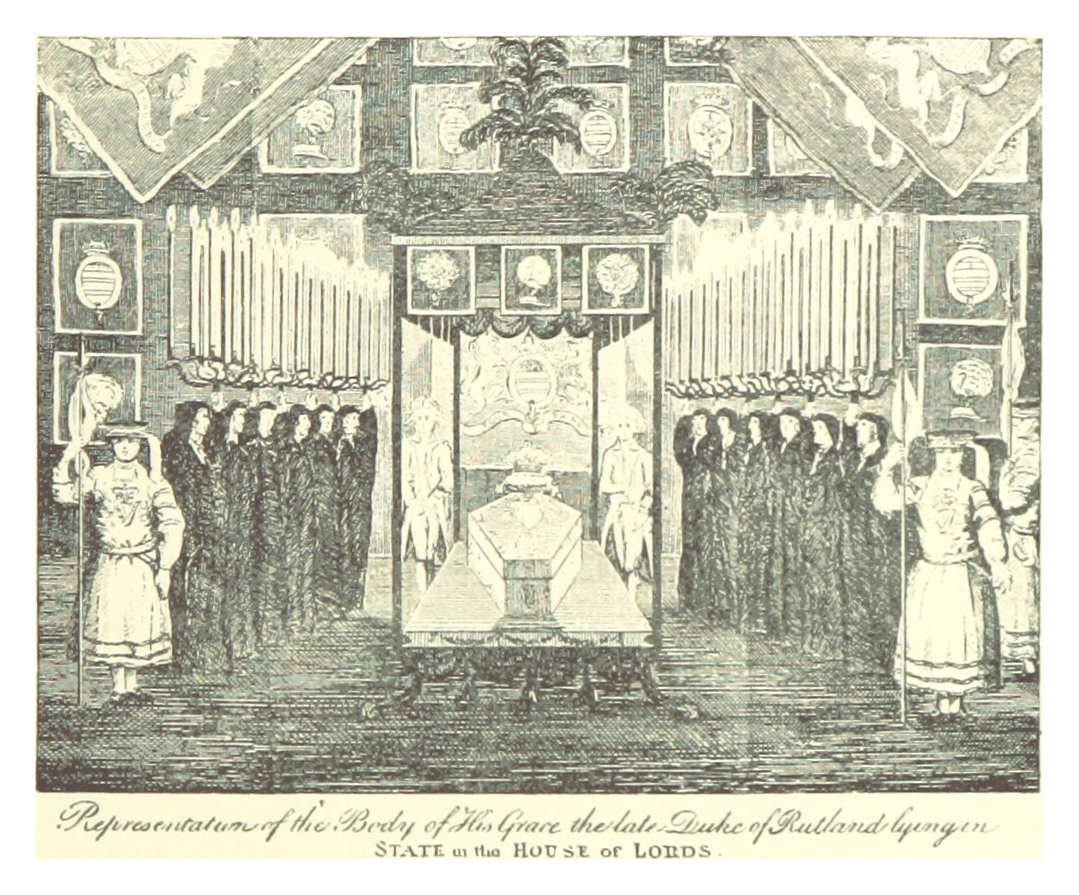
Charles Manners, 4th Duke of Rutland lying in state in the Irish House of Lords chamber after his death in 1787

== See also ==
- Kingdom of Ireland
- List of Irish representative peers
