= Declaratory Act =

British legislation regarding the American colonies

American Colonies Act 1766 (Note: The citation of this act by this short title was authorized by section 1 of, and the first schedule to, the Short Titles Act 1896. Due to the repeal of those provisions it is now authorized by section 19(2) of the Interpretation Act 1978.)
- Act of Parliament
- Parliament of Great Britain
- Long title: An Act for the better securing the Dependency of His Majesty's Dominions in America upon the Crown and Parliament of Great Britain.
- Citation: 6 Geo. 3. c. 12
- Introduced by: Prime Minister Charles Watson-Wentworth, 2nd Marquess of Rockingham (Lords)
- Territorial extent: Great Britain; British America; British West Indies

Dates
- Royal assent: 18 March 1766
- Commencement: 1 May 1766 (Note: Section 1.)
- Repealed: 31 July 1964
Other legislation
Repeals/revokes	Duties in American Colonies Act 1765
Amended by	Statute Law Revision Act 1888
Repealed by	Statute Law Revision Act 1964
Relates to	Dependency of Ireland on Great Britain Act 1719

Status: Repealed

Text of statute as originally enacted

The American Colonies Act 1766 (6 Geo. 3. c. 12), commonly known as the Declaratory Act, was an act of the Parliament of Great Britain which accompanied the repeal of the Duties in American Colonies Act 1765 (5 Geo. 3. c. 12) and the amendment of the Sugar Act 1763 (4 Geo. 3. c. 15). Parliament repealed the Stamp Act because boycotts were hurting British trade and used the declaration to justify the repeal and avoid humiliation. The declaration stated that the Parliament's authority was the same in America as in Britain and asserted Parliament's authority to pass laws that were binding on the American colonies.

== Background ==
Representatives from a number of the Thirteen Colonies assembled as the Stamp Act Congress in response to the Stamp Act 1765 (5 Geo. 3. c. 12), to call into question the right of a distant power to tax them without proper representation. The British Parliament was then faced with colonies who refused to comply with their Act. This, combined with protests that had occurred in the colonies and, more importantly, protests which had arisen in Great Britain from manufacturers who were suffering from the colonies' non-importation agreement, all led to the repeal of the Stamp Act.

Normally the economic activity in the colonies would not have caused such an outcry, but the British economy was still experiencing a post-war depression from the Seven Years' War. Another reason for repeal of the Stamp Act was the replacement of George Grenville, the prime minister who had enacted the Stamp Acts, by Charles Watson-Wentworth, 2nd Marquess of Rockingham. Rockingham was more favourable towards the colonies and furthermore he was antagonistic towards policies that Grenville had enacted. Rockingham invited Benjamin Franklin to speak to Parliament about colonial policy and he portrayed the colonists as in opposition to internal taxes (which were derived from internal colonial transactions) such as the Stamp Act called for, but not external taxes (which were duties laid on imported commodities). Parliament then agreed to repeal the Stamp Act on the condition that the Declaratory Act was passed. On March 18, 1766, Parliament repealed the Stamp Act and passed the Declaratory Act.

== Reaction ==
Although many in Parliament felt that taxes were implied in this clause, other members of Parliament and many of the colonists—who were busy celebrating what they saw as their political victory—did not. Other colonists, however, were outraged because the Declaratory Act hinted that more acts would be coming. This Declaratory Act was copied almost word for word from the Declaratory Act 1719 (6 Geo. 1. c. 5), an act which had placed Ireland in a position of bondage to the Crown, implying that the same fate would come to The Thirteen Colonies. However, the colonists never explicitly called for its repeal, and would seek reconciliation with the Crown up until the last minute.

The political theorist Edwin Mims, Jr. described the American reaction to the Declaratory Act:

When in 1766 this modernised British Parliament, committed by now to the principle of parliamentary sovereignty unlimited and unlimitable, issued a declaration that a parliamentary majority could pass any law it saw fit, it was greeted with an out-cry of horror in the colonies. James Otis and Samuel Adams in Massachusetts, Patrick Henry in Virginia and other colonial leaders along the seaboard screamed "Treason" and "Magna Carta"! Such a doctrine, they insisted, demolished the essence of all their British ancestors had fought for, took the very savour out of that fine Anglo-Saxon liberty for which the sages and patriots of England had died.

== Subsequent developments ==
Following the passage of the act, the British Parliament never again attempted directly to impose taxation upon any of its colonies, or overseas territories, except for the Taxation of Colonies Act 1778 (18 Geo. 3. c. 12) which was passed during the American Revolution.

Even after the recognition of the independence of the United States, the act continued to remain in force for the remaining colonies of the British Empire in the Western Hemisphere.

The whole act was repealed by section 1 of, and the schedule to, the Statute Law Revision Act 1964, which came into force on 31 July 1964. The handful of remaining British colonies in the West Indies were already governed by constitutions explicitly granted under the authority of Parliament, and in particular by the West Indies Act 1962 (10 & 11 Eliz. 2. c. 19).

== See also ==
- American Revolutionary War for the Declaratory Act among post-1763 revenue bills.
- British Empire
- Charles Watson-Wentworth, 2nd Marquess of Rockingham
- Colonial America
- George Grenville
- Townshend Acts
