= Constitution of 1782 =

Legal changes in Ireland and Great Britain

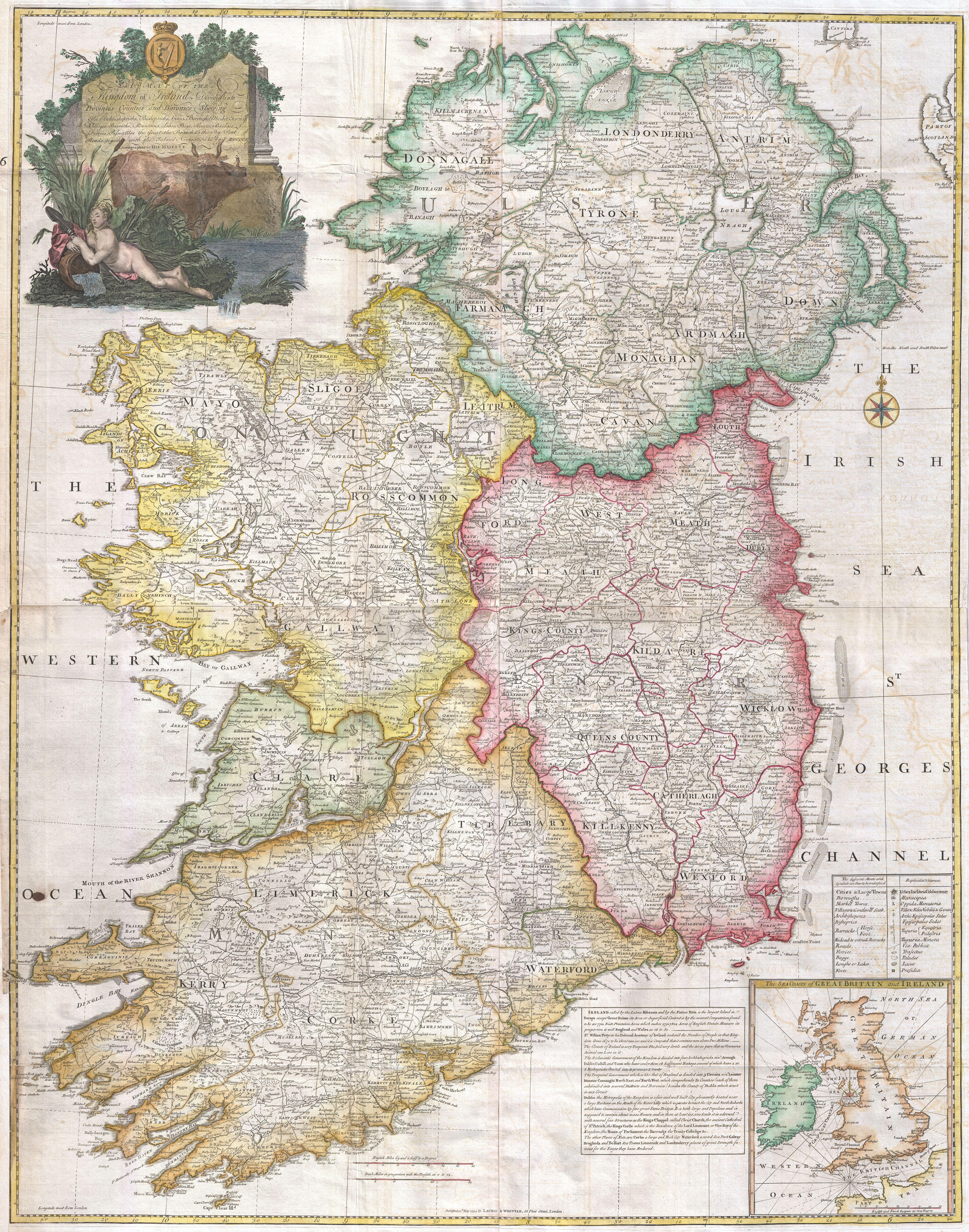
A map of the Kingdom of Ireland dating from the period of legislative independence (1782–1800)

The Constitution of 1782 refers to government of the Kingdom of Ireland following concessions to its legislative and judicial independence by the British Crown and Parliament. Constrained by the revolt of the American colonies and confronted in Ireland by a patriot militia, the Irish Volunteers, the British government abandoned the previously asserted right of the Kingdom of Great Britain to legislate for Ireland and to hear appeal from its courts. The Parliament of Ireland used its new won independence sparingly, disappointing hopes of holding the Vice-Regal administration in Dublin Castle to account, and of broadening representation through Catholic emancipation and reform. Following the suppression of the United Irish rebellion in 1798, the Constitution of 1782 was overturned. The Acts of Union 1800, abolished the legislature in Dublin and incorporated Ireland with Great Britain in the United Kingdom of Great Britain and Ireland.

== Background ==
Under the terms of Poynings' Law of 1495, no law could be passed by the Parliament of Ireland that was not first approved by the Privy Council of England. In 1719, the Parliament of Great Britain passed an "act for the better securing the dependency of the kingdom of Ireland upon the crown of Great Britain" (6 George 1 c.5: Irish Dependency Act). This "Declaratory Act" further restricted Irish legal independence by declaring that the British Parliament could directly pass laws in Ireland and that the British House of Lords was the highest court of appeal for Ireland.

Reinforcing his extensive powers of patronage, including his ability through the control of pocket boroughs to gift up to a third of the seats in the Irish House of Commons, the legislation gave the Lord Lieutenant and the Dublin Castle administration effective control over the agenda of the Irish Parliament and authority to restrict its ability to legislate in any manner conceived as contrary to the British interest.

== The "Revolution of 1782" ==
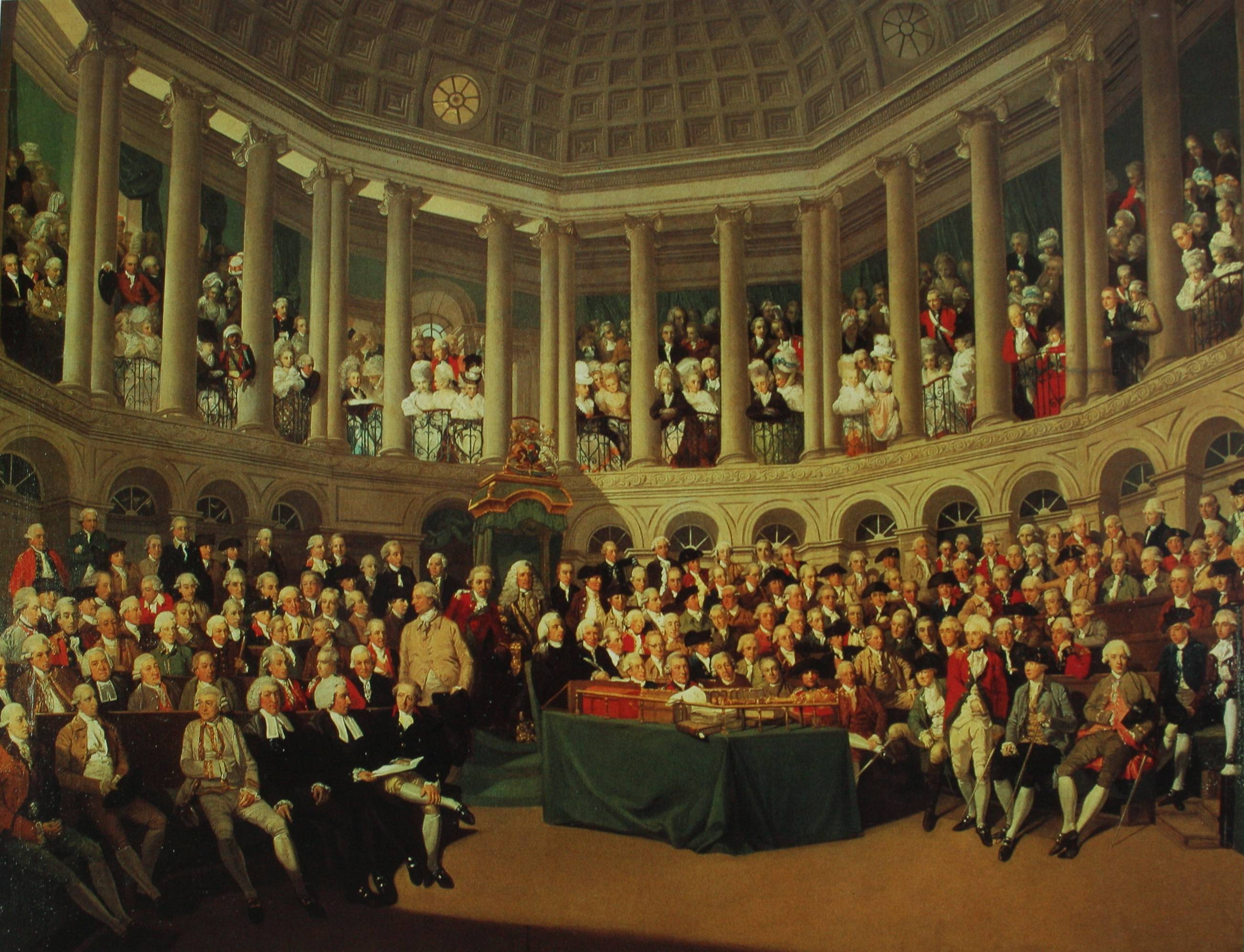
The Irish House of Commons: Henry Grattan urging the Claims of Irish Right, 8 June 1780 (by Francis Wheatley, 1780)

In 1753, these arrangements were challenged on the floor of the Irish House of Commons. That year the Irish Exchequer had a surplus, and Members successfully moved that the Commons had the right to dispose of it without having to consult with the King's ministers. Meeting in Belfast, where the parliamentary franchise was entirely in the hands of the borough's proprietor, the Marquess of Donegall, Patriot Clubs celebrated the defiance of the Commons in the "Money Bill dispute" by asserting, in turn, the right of the "freeholders and freemen of Ireland" to judge "the conduct of their representatives".

In the years 1769-71 there were patriotic protests against to the efforts of a new Lord Lieutenant, George Townshend, Marquess Townshend, to enlarge the power of government patronage at the expense of the "undertakers", or borough owners, ensconced in the Irish House of Lords. These first brought to public attention Henry Flood in the Commons, James Caulfeild, Earl of Charlemont in the Lords who, "influenced and perhaps and perhaps inspired by events in America and by the contemporary Wilkesite agitation in England", espoused "commonwealthmen" principles.

A more sustained challenge to prerogatives claimed by the Crown in London and by its representatives and retainers in Ireland, arose with the onset in 1775 of the American war for independence. The struggle with the colonists and with their French allies drew down the Crown's regular forces in Ireland. In their absence, Volunteer companies were formed among enfranchised Protestants, ostensibly for home defence, but soon, like their kinsmen in the colonies, protesting British trade monopolies and asserting constitutional rights.

For Irish and American Patriots alike, common references were William Molyneux's The Case of Ireland, Stated (1698) which, condemned as seditious, had been ceremonially burned at Tyburn by the public hangman, and Jonathan Swift's Drapier's Letters (1725). Popular tracts, these had tied Ireland's poverty to the country being bound by acts of parliament in England.

In November 1779, Volunteers paraded before the Parliament in Dublin, promised "50,000 joined together, ready to die for their fatherland," invoked the Glorious Revolution of 1688, and protested the inequities of the British Navigation Acts. "Free Trade" (by which was intended the right of the Irish Parliament to set its own tariff and trade policy) was saluted with volleys of shot "heard with startling effect at the Castle." Contending with a war further enlarged by the entry of Spain, London lifted its ban on the Irish export of wool, glass and other goods competitive with British products, and opened the Crown colonies to Irish trade.

The Volunteers pressed forward. In February 1782, delegates from 147 Volunteer corps in Ulster gathered in Dungannon (seat of the ancient Ó Néills and a site for Presbyterian Synods). Taking on "the substance of a national assembly" they resolved that "the claim of any body of men, other than the King, Lords, and Commons of Ireland, to make laws to bind this kingdom, is unconstitutional, illegal and a grievance". In March, a "monster meeting" in Belfast unanimously affirmed the resolution. Magistrates "refused to enforce English Acts, and Grand Juries would not obey legislation of English origin".

In April 1782, with Volunteer cavalry, infantry, and artillery posted on all approaches to the Parliament in Dublin, Henry Grattan, leader of the "patriot" opposition, had a "Declaration of Irish Rights" carried by acclaim in the Commons. Declaring that "the spirit of Molyneux" had triumphed, he proposed that "Ireland is now a nation". In London, the Rockingham Ministry, shaken by further military reverses in America and by the naval victories of the combined French and Spanish fleets, again conceded. In June 1782, the Westminster Parliament repealed the Declaratory Act (22 George 3 c.53: Repeal of the Irish Dependency Act).

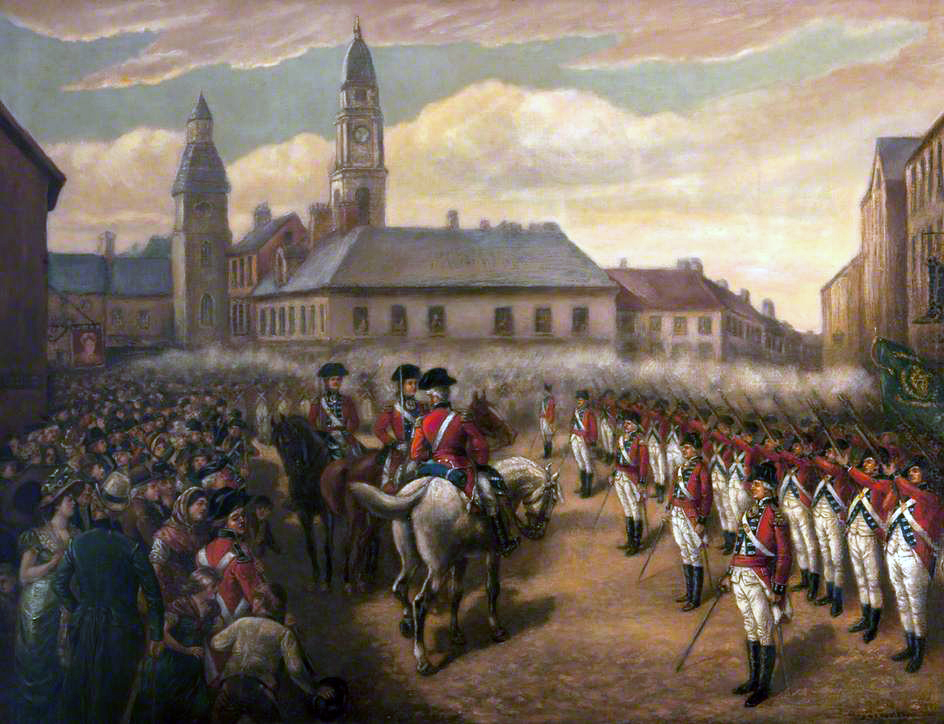
The Lisburn and Lambeg Volunteers firing a feu de joie in honour of the Dungannon Convention, 1782.

Pressed by Flood, Grattan's Patriot rival, and by renewed Volunteer agitation led from Belfast, Westminster followed this up in April 1783 with an act to remove and prevent "all doubts which have arisen, or might arise, concerning the exclusive rights of the parliament and courts of Ireland" (23 George 3 c.28: Irish Appeals Act). Commonly known as the Renunciation Act, in order to "to secure to the people of Ireland the rights claimed by them to be bound only by laws enacted by his Majesty and the parliament of that kingdom" it declared that no appeal from the decision of any court in Ireland could be heard in any court in Great Britain.

This had been a cause in which powerful borough-owning families in Parliament had been content to present themselves as patriots. Legislative independence cost them nothing, and might in time increase the value, and therefore the price, of the votes they controlled in the Commons. They were to take a different view of parliamentary reform.

== Rejection of parliamentary reform ==
In November 1783, Volunteers again converged upon Dublin proposing to correct "certain manifest perversions of parliamentary representation". A bill, which Flood presented to the Commons dressed in his Volunteer uniform, would have enlarged the boundaries of "decayed boroughs", modestly extending a still exclusively Protestant freehold franchise, excluded government office-holders from the Commons, and introduced three, as opposed to eight, year parliaments. But the Volunteer moment had passed. Conscious that, having accepted defeat in America, Britain could again spare troops for Ireland and extend its outlays for Crown patronage, Flood's parliamentary colleagues were not intimidated. Under the "Constitution of 1782", the Ancien régime of Protestant ascendancy and Vice-regal administration adapted and survived.

In 1791, the new formed Society of United Irishmen in Belfast published An Argument on behalf of the Catholics of Ireland. With an eventual print-run of 16,000, in Ireland only Thomas Paine's Rights of Man surpassed it in circulation. The author, the Protestant secretary of the Catholic Committee in Dublin, Wolfe Tone, argued the "Revolution of 1782" had proved "imaginary" because at the crucial juncture the Volunteer movement had split on the question of Catholic emancipation. Only by rallying the Catholics to the national cause, would they have had the strength to force through more substantial constitutional reform. The choice was clear: either "Reform, the Catholics, justice and liberty" or "an unconditional submission to the present, and every future administration".

== "Grattan's Parliament" and the limits of Catholic relief ==
In the 1780s, there had been legislative "achievements": "in advance of anything in England" bills dealing with the treatment of lunacy and disease, the administration of prisons, and the provision of sanitation, and a Corn Law that in the recurring periods of scarcity lowered barriers to imports. But political reform, which "could not be tackled without bringing up the Catholic question", was shunned.

In 1782, "Grattan's Parliament" had conceded a measure of Penal Law "relief". Catholics were permitted to own land on broadly the same terms as Protestants, their clergy were afforded legal toleration, and, if licensed by the local Protestant bishop, Catholics could again open schools. But no majority could be found for the Catholic representation and moderate parliamentary reform that the Grattan believed necessary if the Irish Lords and Commons were to make more effective use of their new won independence.

In 1793, the Patriot leader was able to carry the re-admission of Catholics to the unreformed franchise, and to civil and military offices. But this had been possible only following the Catholic Committee's unprecedented success in convening an elected Catholic Convention (the "Back Lane Parliament") in Dublin and in having a delegation received by the King and his ministers in London. In advance of war with the French Republic, the priority of the British government was domestic tranquility. For a measure that could have little appreciable impact on the conduct of government, the price for overriding Ascendancy opposition in the Irish Parliament was the dissolution of the Catholic Committee, a new government militia that conscripted Catholic and Protestant by lot, and a Convention Act that, outlawing "the election or appointment of assemblies purporting to represent the people", suppressed extra-parliamentary opposition.

Catholic opinion, now without legitimate means of expression, was not placated. Concessions under the relief acts were "permissive rather than obligatory and a newly awakened Protestant Ascendancy chose as often as not to withhold them". Moreover, the retention of the Oath of Supremacy which continue to bar Catholics from parliament, from the judicial bench and from the higher offices of state, when all else was conceded, "seemed petty, and was interpreted by the newly politicised Catholic populace as final proof that the existing government was their natural enemy".

== Rebellion and Union ==
Meanwhile, among the Presbyterians ("Protestant Dissenters") of the north-east (Belfast and its hinterlands), reports of the revolution in France, where a Catholic people were seen to vindicate the Rights of Man in defiance of their clergy, reduced the fear of making common cause with their country's dispossessed majority. Under growing government repression, they formed, in the United Irishmen, the nuclei of a "mass-based revolutionary organisation" that, in hopes of French assistance, broke into open rebellion in 1798.

The British government, which had had to deploy its own forces to suppress the rebellion and to turn back and defeat French intervention, determined upon a union with Great Britain. With effect from 1 January 1801, Acts of Union abolished the Irish legislature and transferred Ireland's still exclusively Protestant representation to the Parliament at Westminster.

== See also ==
- Irish House of Commons
- Irish House of Lords
