= Irish Patriot Party =

- Leader: Henry Flood (1760s–1780s); Henry Grattan (1780s–1800)
- Founded: c. 1760
- Dissolved: c. 1803
- Merged into: British Whig Party
- Headquarters: Dublin, Kingdom of Ireland
- Ideology: Whiggism; Irish nationalism Irish autonomy Catholic emancipation (factional); Irish autonomy Classical liberalism Free trade
- Political position: Centre to centre-left
- Slogan: "The channel forbids union; the ocean forbids separation"

The Irish Patriot Party, also referred to as the Irish Whigs, was an informal political grouping in the Irish House of Commons during the 18th century. They were primarily supportive of Whig concepts of personal liberty combined with an Irish identity that rejected full independence but advocated strong self-government within the British Empire.

Due to the discriminatory penal laws, the Irish Parliament at the time was exclusively Anglican Protestant. Their main achievement was the Constitution of 1782, which gave Ireland legislative independence.

== Early Irish Patriots ==
In 1689, a short-lived "Patriot Parliament" had sat in Dublin before James II, and briefly obtained de facto legislative independence, while ultimately subject to the English monarchy. The parliament's membership mostly consisted of land-owning Roman Catholic Jacobites who lost the ensuing War of the Grand Alliance in 1689–91.

The name was then used from the 1720s to describe Irish supporters of the British Whig party, specifically the Patriot faction within it. Swift's "Drapier's Letters" and earlier works by Domville, Molyneaux and Lucas are seen as precursors, deploring the undue control exercised by the British establishment over the Irish political system. In contrast with the 1689 parliament, this movement consisted of middle-class Protestants. The appointed senior political and church officials were usually English-born.

The "Money Bill dispute" of 1753–56 arose from the refusal of Henry Boyle, an MP and Chancellor of the Exchequer of Ireland, to allow an Irish revenue surplus to be paid over to London. Supported by the Earl of Kildare and Thomas Carter, Boyle was dismissed by the viceroy Dorset, and then appealed to public opinion as a defender of Irish interests. In 1755 the next viceroy arranged a favourable compromise, and Boyle was re-instated and created Earl of Shannon.

Boyle's supporters found allies at Westminster among the Patriot Whigs of William Pitt the Elder. The philosophy was that their legal and trading benefits, and personal freedoms of being of English origin derived from the Magna Carta, and more so the Bill of Rights that arose from the 1688 Glorious Revolution, were absent for those living in Ireland. The Dependency Act 1719 was considered particularly contentious.

In the years 1769-71, opposition to the efforts of a new Lord Lieutenant, George Townshend, Marquess Townshend, to enlarge the power of government patronage at the expense of the Kingdom's "undertakers" (the great families in possession of parliamentary boroughs) raised the public profiles of James Caulfeild, Earl of Charlemont in the Irish House of Lords, and of Henry Flood in the Irish House of Commons. "Influenced and perhaps and perhaps inspired by events in America and by the contemporary Wilkesite agitation in England", they espoused "commonwealthmen" principles.

== Grattan's Patriots ==
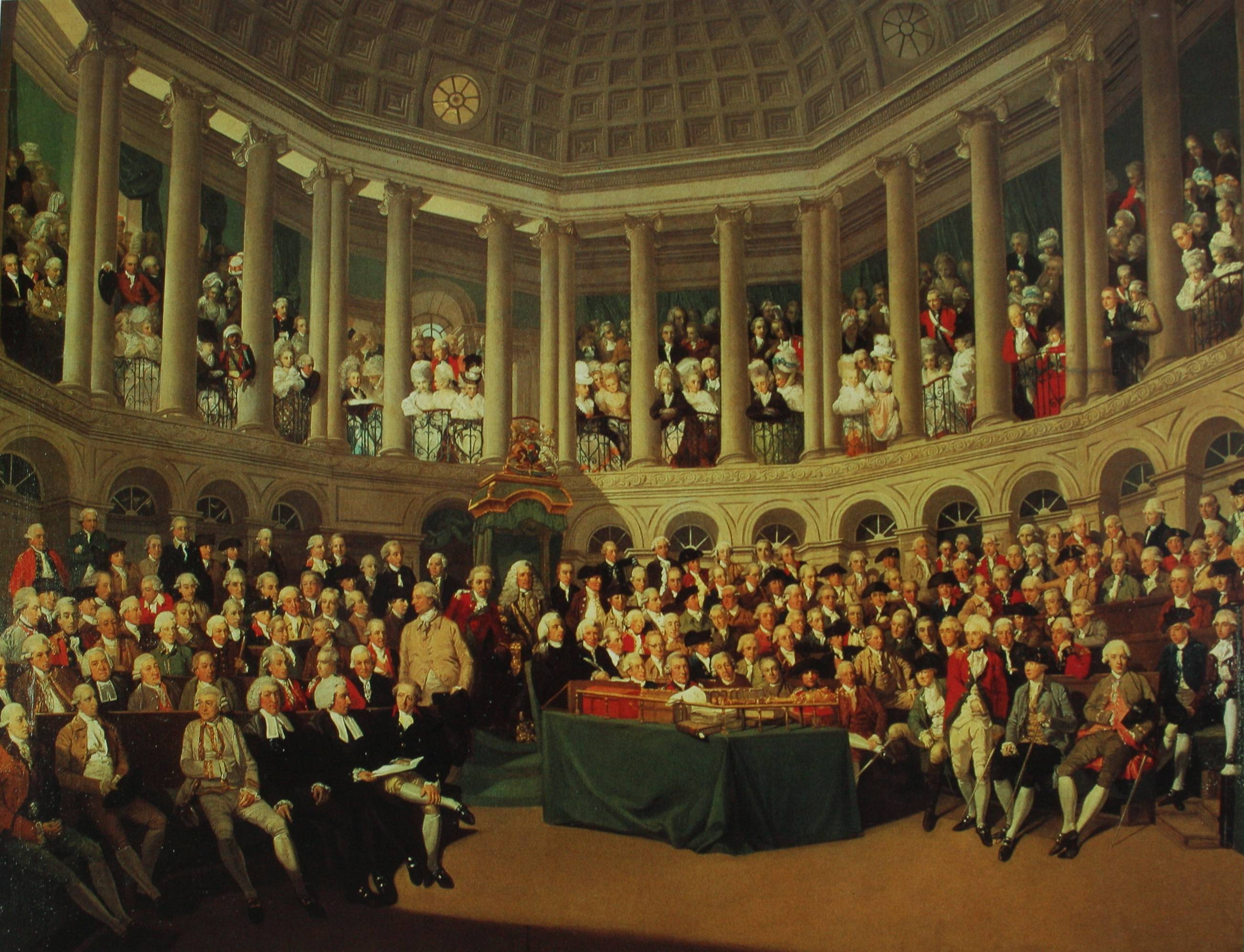
The Irish House of Commons where Grattan and the Irish Patriots sat in the late 18th century.

=== Limited success ===
With the onset, from 1775, of the American War of Independence, Charlemont and Flood emerged with Charlemont's protégé in the Henry Grattan as the leaders of a relatively small and informal parliamentary opposition. With the possible threat of invasion by France in 1778, a large militia had been formed known as the Irish Volunteers. In the absence of the regular garrison, they served largely as a bargaining tool for the Irish patriot politicians in their bid to gain greater independence from London, without having to fire a shot in anger. As had the American colonists before 1776, they arranged local "non-importation agreements" in 1779, where the signatories undertook not to buy British goods as a form of Boycott protest. Their aim was complete self-government.

- They also wanted free trade with the outside world, as Irish overseas trade had been greatly restricted and taxed since the 1650s by the Navigation Acts. Merchants had to sell through England and could not trade directly with other countries or even the rest of the British Empire. A host of Irish goods were banned from export including wool. Reforming the Navigation Acts in December 1779 was the Patriots' most useful achievement, and fostered a modest economic boom in the 1780s.
- While the Patriots and the viceroy Lord Lieutenant of Ireland led Irish administration often disagreed strongly on how the country should be governed, they shared a belief that Ireland should have greater self-government. Controls such as Poynings' Law were abolished.
- From 1780, the Irish Parliament refused to vote for taxes to support the British government in and out of Ireland.

The young Jonah Barrington recalled the "military ardour which seized all Ireland, when the whole country had entered into resolutions to free itself forever from English domination. The entire kingdom took up arms, regiments were formed in every quarter, the highest, the lowest, and the middle orders, all entered the ranks of freedom, and every corporation, whether civil or military, pledged life and fortune to attain and establish Irish independence."

"My father had raised and commanded two corps—a dragoon regiment called the Cullenagh Rangers, and the Ballyroan Light Infantry. My elder brother commanded the Kilkenny Horse and the Durrow Light Dragoons. The general enthusiasm caught me, and before I well knew what I was about, I found myself a military martinet and a red-hot patriot. Having been a university man, I was also considered to be, of course, a writer, and was accordingly called on to draw up resolutions for volunteer regiments all over the county."

In April 1782, Grattan argued against compromise and secured autonomy. The Dublin parliament voted him £100,000 in thanks, of which he accepted £50,000. Fearing a similar secession to the one that had just lost them the Thirteen American colonies, the British government agreed to their demands. In a December 1781 address to the Yankee Club of Stewartstown in the County of Tyrone, Ireland, George Washington had announced "The hospitality and beneficence of your countrymen, to those of mine who have been driven from their homes... have endeared the name of Ireland to every American, and state a lasting claim to the affections and gratitude of this country."

Such was the influence of Grattan that the subsequent eighteen years of greater legislative independence were known as Grattan's Parliament, with the odious Dependency Act 1719 repealed by the Repeal of Act for Securing Dependence of Ireland Act 1782. The sympathetic Fox-North Coalition government in London agreed that the Irish parliament would legislate exclusively for Ireland. Having support from the Irish parliament and the British government. "Wanting the fullest constitutional agreement on the new status of Ireland, Grattan also sought and obtained a further Declaratory Act from the Parliament of Great Britain that was passed on 22 January 1783, which included this formula:

"Be it enacted that the right claimed by the people of Ireland to be bound only by laws enacted by his Majesty and the Parliament of that kingdom, in all cases whatever shall be, and is hereby declared to be established and ascertained forever, and shall at no time be questioned or questionable."

The only remaining constitutional link between the monarchies of Ireland and Britain was the Crown, represented by the viceroy. Grattan's view was that a beneficial link should be maintained with Britain and compared his policy to Ireland's geographic situation in a neat formula: "The Channel forbids union; the ocean forbids separation".

=== Problems ===
- From 1783 to 1784, the Patriots could not agree on how far and how fast the Penal Laws restricting Ireland's Roman Catholics should be reformed. Conservatives (including Flood) pointed to the Relief Act of 1778 and felt that enough had been reformed, but liberals like Grattan wanted to reform the tithe tax laws and to include Catholics in parliament. This division generally led to conservative majorities against reform until 1793.
- The viceroy increased the conservative majority by wielding patronage when required; MPs were effectively bribed by being given sinecure posts with large salaries.
- Grattan mistakenly preferred an opposition role and allowed the viceroy to nominate a conservative administration that was generally nicknamed the "Junta". He failed to reform the tithe laws in 1788 that were generally unpopular with poorer Catholics.
- Ireland's new right to free trade led to a dispute with Portugal in 1780–1787; Irish exports were embargoed while English exports were not. Some Patriots unsuccessfully advocated declaring war on Portugal, which has been historically allied to England. The dispute emphasized Ireland's complete reliance on the Royal Navy to protect its overseas trade and merchant shipping.

The reformist Patriots struggled in the following years to gain anything approaching a majority on social reform issues in the Irish House of Commons, but in 1793, another Catholic Relief Act was passed. In 1789 the reformist element formally established the "Irish Whig Party" but soon lost goodwill in London for its views on the Regency crisis.

=== French Revolution ===
The French Revolution emphasised the Patriots' divisions. The major reform of the Roman Catholic Relief Act 1793 allowed Catholics to vote, to practice as lawyers, to act as grand jurors and to enter Trinity College Dublin as students, but this reform had to be pushed along by London, no doubt to Grattan's embarrassment. Opponents of this reform spoke of the need to protect a "Protestant Ascendancy". The 1793 Act was based on the British Roman Catholic Relief Act 1791. A short-lived Catholic Irish Brigade was formed in 1794 from refugee royalist officers from the formerly French Irish Brigade.

The growth of the radical United Irish movement from 1791 upstaged Grattan by calling for a complete break with Britain and full emancipation for all religions in a new republic. Given its support for France in the War of the First Coalition, it was outlawed in 1795.

In 1795, the London government sponsored reforms, to head off trouble, by repealing the Hearth tax and funding a Catholic seminary in the form of St Patrick's College, Maynooth. However, earlier in the year it had quickly recalled the new viceroy Lord Fitzwilliam, who had intended to effect further Catholic reliefs and to appoint Grattan to the administration. The sacking of FitzWilliam and the imposition of martial law in March 1797 caused Grattan and his supportive group of MPs to withdraw from parliament in May 1797, and by then the civil unrest caused by the army, the militia, the Orange Order, the Defenders and the United Irishmen had made Ireland ungovernable.

The unsuccessful 1798 rebellion launched in May 1798 by the republican United Irishmen seriously damaged the Patriot cause. Although most liberal Patriots opposed the rebellion, they became tarnished by association, and support dropped for them in Britain. Some Patriot MPs of the 1780s, such as James Napper Tandy and Lord Edward FitzGerald, had become United Irish leaders in the 1790s. The Rebellion, which had been launched in coordination with a French invasion, provoked the British government of William Pitt into pushing through the 1800 Act of Union, merging the parliaments of Ireland and Great Britain into the new "United Kingdom". Naturally, the Patriots opposed this in heated debates in 1799 and 1800.

== Act of Union ==
Following the Act of Union 1800, the Irish Parliament was abolished. A few Irish Patriots took up seats in the new unified British House of Commons in London, under the notional leadership of Grattan. Within a few years, they had become almost entirely submerged within the British Whig Party, with whom they were allied, and disappeared from the political landscape.

== Legacy ==
Grattan's advocacy of liberal-minded moderate Irish nationalist self-rule with links to Britain had a resonance over the following century. It was taken up by Daniel O'Connell's Repeal Association in the 1830s that intended to repeal the Act of Union; by the Young Ireland movement in the 1840s; and later by the Irish Parliamentary Party (IPP) that campaigned for the restoration of Home Rule in Ireland. The IPP and its successors dominated the political scene in Ireland for decades until its defeat by the fully secessionist Sinn Féin movement in the 1918 general election.

== See also ==
- Patriot Whigs
- Protestant Nationalist

== Sources ==
- McDowell, R. B. (1979). Ireland in the age of imperialism and revolution, 1760–1801.
