= Declaratory Act 1719 =

Act of the Parliament of Great Britain

Dependency of Ireland on Great Britain Act 1719
- Act of Parliament
- Parliament of Great Britain
- Long title: An Act for the better securing the dependency of the Kingdom of Ireland on the Crown of Great Britain.
- Citation: 6 Geo. 1. c. 5
- Territorial extent: Great Britain

Dates
- Royal assent: 7 April 1720
- Commencement: 23 November 1719 (Note: Start of session.)
- Repealed: 21 June 1782
Other legislation
Repealed by	Repeal of Act for Securing Dependence of Ireland Act 1782
Relates to	American Colonies Act 1766; Irish Appeals Act 1783

Status: Repealed

Text of statute as originally enacted

The Dependency of Ireland on Great Britain Act 1719 (6 Geo. 1. c. 5) was an act passed by the Parliament of Great Britain which declared that it had the right to pass laws for the Kingdom of Ireland, and that the British House of Lords had appellate jurisdiction for Irish court cases. It became known as the Declaratory Act, and opponents in the Irish Patriot Party referred to it as the Sixth of George I (from the regnal year it was passed). Legal and political historians have also called it the Dependency of Ireland on Great Britain Act 1719 or the Irish Parliament Act 1719. Prompted by a routine Irish lawsuit, it was aimed at resolving the long-running dispute between the British and the Irish House of Lords as to which was the final court of appeal from the Irish Courts. Along with Poynings' Law, the Declaratory Act became a symbol of the subservience of the Parliament of Ireland, and its repeal was long an aim of Irish statesmen, which was finally achieved for Anglican Irish as part of the Constitution of 1782.

== Background ==
In 1709 the Irish Court of Exchequer heard a lawsuit between Maurice Annesley and his cousin Hester Sherlock over which of them had the right to possession of certain lands at Naas, County Kildare. The court found in Annesley's favour; Mrs. Sherlock appealed to the Irish House of Lords which upheld her appeal. Annesley then invoked the long-disputed jurisdiction of the British House of Lords to hear appeals from the Irish courts, and that house pronounced in his favour. The Court of Exchequer duly complied with the decree of the British House, but Mrs. Sherlock appealed again to the Irish house, which ordered the Barons of the Exchequer to comply with its own decree and, when they refused, imprisoned them for contempt of parliament. The political uproar was out of all proportion to the importance of the lawsuit itself: in the words of John Pocklington, one of the imprisoned Barons, "a flame broke forth, arousing the country's last resentment (i.e. against the judges)".

== Passage ==
The bill had its second reading in the Commons on 4 March 1719, where it was chiefly opposed on the grounds that it appeared to have no purpose beyond increasing the power of the House of Lords. Other objections included an argument that the preamble and the enacting section of the bill were contradictory, and that Ireland had historically had an independent judiciary. It was supported by Joseph Jekyll and Philip Yorke, and carried 140 votes to 83. It was then passed on March 26.

== Provisions ==
Section I of the act noted that the Irish House of Lords had recently "assumed to themselves a Power and Jurisdiction to examine, correct and amend" judgements of the Irish courts, which it held to be illegal. As such, it declared that the Kingdom of Ireland was subordinate to and dependent upon the British crown, and that the king, with the advice and consent of the Parliament of Great Britain, had "full power and authority to make laws and statutes of sufficient validity to bind the Kingdom and people of Ireland". Section II declared that the House of Lords of Ireland had no jurisdiction to judge, affirm or reverse any judgement, sentence or decree made in any court within the Kingdom of Ireland, and that all proceedings before the house upon any such matter were declared to be null and void to all intents and purposes whatsoever.

== Aftermath ==
The Irish House of Lords was understandably infuriated by the curtailment of its powers, and the Barons of the Exchequer, though they were soon released from custody, were subject to intense vilification. While many people thought that the Irish House of Lords had brought about the crisis by its own high-handed behaviour, the "Sixth of George I" remained a source of grievance for decades.

The act provided a model for the American Colonies Act 1766 (6 Geo. 3. c. 12), which is also known as the "Declaratory Act" and was a similar source of grievance in the Thirteen Colonies. The British defeat in the subsequent American War of Independence prompted a more conciliatory tone towards Ireland. The whole act was repealed by the Repeal of Act for Securing Dependence of Ireland Act 1782 (22 Geo. 3. c. 53), which paved the way for the Constitution of 1782 establishing greater autonomy for the Irish parliament.
