= List of acts of the Parliament of Great Britain from 1719 =

This is a complete list of acts of the Parliament of Great Britain for the year 1719.

For acts passed until 1707, see the list of acts of the Parliament of England and the list of acts of the Parliament of Scotland. See also the list of acts of the Parliament of Ireland.

For acts passed from 1801 onwards, see the list of acts of the Parliament of the United Kingdom. For acts of the devolved parliaments and assemblies in the United Kingdom, see the list of acts of the Scottish Parliament, the list of acts of the Northern Ireland Assembly, and the list of acts and measures of Senedd Cymru; see also the list of acts of the Parliament of Northern Ireland.

The number shown after each act's title is its chapter number. Acts are cited using this number, preceded by the year(s) of the reign during which the relevant parliamentary session was held; thus the Union with Ireland Act 1800 is cited as "39 & 40 Geo. 3. c. 67", meaning the 67th act passed during the session that started in the 39th year of the reign of George III and which finished in the 40th year of that reign. Note that the modern convention is to use Arabic numerals in citations (thus "41 Geo. 3" rather than "41 Geo. III"). Acts of the last session of the Parliament of Great Britain and the first session of the Parliament of the United Kingdom are both cited as "41 Geo. 3".

Acts passed by the Parliament of Great Britain did not have a short title; however, some of these acts have subsequently been given a short title by acts of the Parliament of the United Kingdom (such as the Short Titles Act 1896).

Before the Acts of Parliament (Commencement) Act 1793 came into force on 8 April 1793, acts passed by the Parliament of Great Britain were deemed to have come into effect on the first day of the session in which they were passed. Because of this, the years given in the list below may in fact be the year before a particular act was passed.

== 6 Geo. 1 ==
The fifth session of the 5th Parliament of Great Britain, which met from 23 November 1719 until 11 June 1720.

This session was also traditionally cited as 6 G. 1.

=== Public acts ===
Short title	Citation	Royal assent
Long title
Land Tax Act 1719 (repealed)	6 Geo. 1. c. 1	22 December 1719
An Act for granting to His Majesty an Aid by a Land Tax, to be raised in Great Britain, for the Service of the Year One Thousand Seven Hundred and Twenty. (Repealed by Statute Law Revision Act 1867 (30 & 31 Vict. c. 59))
Taxation, etc. Act 1719 (repealed)	6 Geo. 1. c. 2	18 January 1720
An Act for continuing the Duties on Malt, Mum, Cyder, and Perry, for the Service of the Year One Thousand Seven Hundred and Twenty; and for enabling the Lords Commissioners of His Majesty's Treasury to call in such Exchequer Bills as are to be canceled and discharged, with Money appointed for that Purpose. (Repealed by Statute Law Revision Act 1867 (30 & 31 Vict. c. 59))
Mutiny Act 1719 (repealed)	6 Geo. 1. c. 3	18 January 1720
An Act for punishing Mutiny and Desertion; and for the better Payment of the Army and their Quarters. (Repealed by Statute Law Revision Act 1867 (30 & 31 Vict. c. 59))
National Debt Act 1719 (repealed)	6 Geo. 1. c. 4	7 April 1720
An Act for enabling the South Sea Company to increase their present Capital Stock and Fund, by redeeming such public Debts and Incumbrances as are therein mentioned; and for raising Money, to be applied for lessening several of the public Debts and Incumbrances; and for calling in the present Exchequer Bills remaining uncanceled; and for making forth new Bills in Lieu thereof, to be circulated and exchanged, upon Demand, at or near the Exchequer. (Repealed by Statute Law Revision Act 1870 (33 & 34 Vict. c. 69))
Dependency of Ireland on Great Britain Act 1719 or the Declaratory Act 1719 or the Irish Parliament Act 1719 or the Sixth of George I (repealed)	6 Geo. 1. c. 5	7 April 1720
An Act for the better securing the dependency of the Kingdom of Ireland on the Crown of Great Britain. (Repealed by Repeal of Act for Securing Dependence of Ireland Act 1782 (22 Geo. 3. c. 53))
Excessive Loading of Vehicles, London and Westminster Act 1719 (repealed)	6 Geo. 1. c. 6	7 April 1720
An Act for preventing the Carriage of excessive Loads of Meal, Malt, Bricks, and Coals, within Ten Miles of the Cities of London and Westminster. (Repealed by Continuance of Certain Laws, etc. Act 1771 (11 Geo. 3. c. 51), Highway Act 1835 (5 & 6 Will. 4. c. 50) and Statute Law Revision Act 1948 (11 & 12 Geo. 6. c. 62))
Montrose Beer Duties Act 1719 (repealed)	6 Geo. 1. c. 7	7 April 1720
An Act for laying a Duty of Two Pennies Scotts, or one Sixth Part of a Penny Sterling, upon every Pint of Ale or Beer that shall be vended or sold within the Town of Montrose and Privileges thereof, for supplying the said Town with fresh Water; and for other Purposes therein mentioned. (Repealed by Statute Law Revision Act 1948 (11 & 12 Geo. 6. c. 62))
Bruntisland Beer Duties Act 1719 (repealed)	6 Geo. 1. c. 8	7 April 1720
An Act for laying a Duty of Two Pennies Scotts, or one Sixth Part of a Penny Sterling, upon every Scotts Pint of Beer or Ale vended or sold within the Town of Bruntisland and Liberties thereof, for increasing the public Revenue of the said Town; and for other Purposes therein mentioned. (Repealed by Statute Law Revision Act 1948 (11 & 12 Geo. 6. c. 62))
Pittenweem Beer Duties Act 1719 (repealed)	6 Geo. 1. c. 9	7 April 1720
An Act for laying a Duty of Two Pennies Scotts, or one Sixth Part of a Penny Sterling, upon every Scotts Pint of Beer and Ale that shall be vended or sold within the Town of Pittenweem and Liberties thereof, for repairing the Harbour there; and for maintaining other public Works of the said Town. (Repealed by Statute Law Revision Act 1948 (11 & 12 Geo. 6. c. 62))
National Debt (No. 2) Act 1719 (repealed)	6 Geo. 1. c. 10	12 April 1720
An Act for making forth new Exchequer Bills, not exceeding One Million, at a certain Interest; and for lending the same to the South Sea Company at an higher Interest, upon Security of re-paying the same and such high Interest into the Exchequer, for Uses to which the Fund for lessening the Public Debts (called The Sinking Fund) is applicable; and for circulating and exchanging, upon Demand, the said Bills at or near the Exchequer." (Repealed by Statute Law Revision Act 1870 (33 & 34 Vict. c. 69))
Plate Duty Act 1719 (repealed)	6 Geo. 1. c. 11	11 June 1720
An Act for laying a Duty upon Wrought Plate; and for applying Money arising from the clear Produce by Sale of the forfeited Estates towards answering His Majesty's Supply; and for taking off the Drawbacks upon Hops exported for Ireland; and for Payment of Annuities, to be purchased after the Rate of Four Pounds per Centum per Annum at the Exchequer, redeemable by Parliament, and for appropriating Supplies granted in this Session of Parliament; and to prevent counterfeiting Receipts and Warrants of the Officers of the South Sea Company; and for explaining a late Act, (Note: Salt Duties Act 1718 (5 Geo. 1. c. 18)) concerning Foreign Salt cellared or locked up before the Four and Twentieth Day of June One Thousand Seven Hundred and Nineteen; and to give a further Time for paying Duties on certain Apprentices Indentures; and for Relief of Thomas Vernon Esquire, in relation to a Parcel of Senna imported in the Year One Thousand Seven Hundred and Sixteen. (Repealed by Hallmarking Act 1973 (c. 43))
Customs Act 1719 (repealed)	6 Geo. 1. c. 12	11 June 1720
An Act for preventing of Frauds and Abuses in the Allowances on damaged Wines; and for lengthening the Time for the Drawbacks on the Exportation of Wines. (Repealed by Statute Law Revision Act 1867 (30 & 31 Vict. c. 59))
Manufacture of Serges, etc. Act 1719 (repealed)	6 Geo. 1. c. 13	11 June 1720
An Act for ascertaining the Breadths, and preventing Frauds and Abuses in manufacturing, Serges, Plaidings, and Fingrums, and for regulating the Manufactures of Stockings, in that Part of Great Britain called Scotland. (Repealed by Statute Law Revision Act 1867 (30 & 31 Vict. c. 59))
Importation Act 1719 (repealed)	6 Geo. 1. c. 14	11 June 1720
An Act for prohibiting the Importation of Raw Silk and Mohair Yarn, of the Product or Manufacture of Asia, from any Ports or Places in The Streights, or Levant Seas, except such Ports and Places as are within the Dominions of the Grand Seignior. (Note: The 'Dominions of the Grand Seignior' is a reference to the Ottoman Empire.) (Repealed by Repeal of Acts Concerning Importation (No. 2) Act 1822 (3 Geo. 4. c. 42))
Importation (No. 2) Act 1719 (repealed)	6 Geo. 1. c. 15	11 June 1720
An Act to repeal so much of the Act, intituled, "An Act for preventing Frauds, and regulating Abuses, in His Majesty's Customs," (Note: Customs Act 1662 (14 Cha. 2. c. 11)) passed in the Thirteenth and Fourteenth Years of King Charles the Second, as relates to the prohibiting the Importation of Deal Boards and Fir Timber from Germany. (Repealed by Repeal of Acts Concerning Importation (No. 2) Act 1822 (3 Geo. 4. c. 42))
Preservation of Timber Trees, etc. (Scotland) Act 1719 (repealed)	6 Geo. 1. c. 16	11 June 1720
An Act to explain and amend an Act passed in the First Year of His Majesty's Reign, intituled, "An Act to encourage the planting of Timber Trees, Fruit Trees, and other Trees, for Ornament, Shelter, or Profit; and for the better Preservation of the same;" (Note: Preservation of Timber Trees Act 1715 (1 Geo. 1. St. 2. c. 48)) and for the preventing the burning of Woods; and for the better Preservation of the Fences of such Woods. (Repealed by Statute Law Revision Act 1887 (50 & 51 Vict. c. 59))
Debts Due to the Army, etc. Act 1719 (repealed)	6 Geo. 1. c. 17	11 June 1720
An Act for appointing Commissioners, to examine, state, and determine, the Debt, due to the Army; and to examine and state the Demands of several Foreign Princes and States, for Subsidies during the late War. (Repealed by Statute Law Revision Act 1867 (30 & 31 Vict. c. 59))
Royal Exchange and London Assurance Corporation Act 1719 or the Bubble Act 1719 (repealed)	6 Geo. 1. c. 18	11 June 1720
An Act for better securing certain Powers and Privileges intended to be granted by His Majesty by Two Charters for Assurance of Ships and Merchandizes at Sea, and for lending Money on Bottomry; and for restraining several extravagant and unwarrantable Practices therein mentioned. (Repealed by London Assurance Act 1891 (54 & 55 Vict. c. cxxvi) and Royal Exchange Assurance Act 1901 (1 Edw. 7. c. x))
Perpetuation, etc. of Acts 1719 (repealed)	6 Geo. 1. c. 19	11 June 1720
An Act for making perpetual so much of an Act made in the Tenth Year of the Reign of Queen Anne, (Note: Continuance of Laws Act 1711 (10 Ann. c. 24)) for the reviving and continuing several Acts therein mentioned, as relates to the building and repairing County Gaols; and also an Act of the Eleventh and Twelfth Years of the Reign of King William the Third, (Note: Piracy Act 1698 (11 Will. 3. c. 7)) for the more effectual Suppression of Piracy; and for making more effectual the Act of the Thirteenth Year of the Reign of King Charles the Second, intituled, "An Act for establishing Articles and Orders for the regulating and better Government of His Majesty's Ships of War, and Forces by Sea." (Note: Navy Act 1661 (13 Cha. 2. St. 1. c. 9)) (Repealed by Statute Law Revision Act 1867 (30 & 31 Vict. c. 59))
Hertfordshire Highways Act 1719 (repealed)	6 Geo. 1. c. 20	7 April 1720
An Act for continuing the Acts formerly made, for repairing the Highways in the County of Hertford therein mentioned; and for making the said Acts more effectual. (Repealed by Hertfordshire Roads Act 1732 (6 Geo. 2. c. 24))
Excise Act 1719 (repealed)	6 Geo. 1. c. 21	11 June 1720
An Act for preventing Frauds and Abuses in the Public Revenues of Excise, Customs, Stamp Duties, Post-office, and House-money. (Repealed by Inland Revenue Repeal Act 1870 (33 & 34 Vict. c. 99))
Insolvent Debtors' Relief, etc. Act 1719 (repealed)	6 Geo. 1. c. 22	11 June 1720
An Act for Relief of Insolvent Debtors; and for the more easy Discharge of Bankrupts out of Execution, after their Certificates allowed. (Repealed by Statute Law Revision Act 1867 (30 & 31 Vict. c. 59))
Robbery, etc. Act 1719 (repealed)	6 Geo. 1. c. 23	11 June 1720
An Act for the further preventing Robbery, Burglary, and other Felonies; and for the more effectual Transportation of Felons. (Repealed by Criminal Law Act 1826 (7 Geo. 4. c. 64))
Crown Lands (Forfeited Estates) Act 1719 (repealed)	6 Geo. 1. c. 24	11 June 1720
An Act for better explaining the Nature of Conveyances to be made to the Purchasers of the forfeited Estates, by the Commissioners and Trustees acting in Scotland; and for preventing Difficulties in determining Claims on the said Estates; and to enable the Judges in Ireland to examine Witnesses relating to Claims on forfeited Estates there; and for enabling such Corporations as shall purchase any of the said Estates to grant Annuities, not exceeding the Yearly Value of the said Estates; and for relieving the Widow and Daughters of the late Sir Donald Mac Donald. (Repealed by Statute Law Revision Act 1948 (11 & 12 Geo. 6. c. 62))
Stevenage and Biggleswade Road Act 1719 (repealed)	6 Geo. 1. c. 25	7 April 1720
An Act for repairing the Roads from Stevenidge, in the County of Hertford, to Biggleswade, in the County of Bedford. (Repealed by Stevenage, Biggleswade and Arsley Road Act 1832 (2 & 3 Will. 4. c. lxxvi))
Surrey and Kent Roads Act 1719 (repealed)	6 Geo. 1. c. 26	11 June 1720
An Act for enlarging the Term granted by an Act in the Fourth Year of His Majesty's Reign, intituled, "An Act for repairing the Highways leading from The Stones End in Kent-street, to The Lime Kilns in East Greenwich, near Black Heath, and to Lewisham Church, being the Tunbridge Road, in the County of Kent; and for repairing and amending the Highways and Roads leading from Westminster Ferry, in the Parish of Lambeth, in the County of Surrey, to New Cross, in the Parish of Deptford, in the County of Kent;" (Note: Southwark, Greenwich and Lewisham Roads Act 1717 (4 Geo. 1. c. 5 Pr.)) and for enlarging the Term granted by an Act passed in the Fourth Year of His Majesty's Reign, intituled, "An Act for amending the Roads from the City of London to the Town of East Grinstead, in the County of Sussex, and to Sutton and Kingston, in the County of Surrey;" (Note: London, East Grinstead, Sutton and Kingston Roads Act 1717 (4 Geo. 1. c. 4 Pr.)) and for explaining and amending the same Act. (Repealed by Statute Law (Repeals) Act 2013 (c. 2))
Derwent Navigation Act 1719	6 Geo. 1. c. 27	7 April 1720
An Act for making the River Darwent, in the County of Derby, navigable.
Douglas Navigation Act 1719	6 Geo. 1. c. 28	7 April 1720
An Act for making the River Douglas, alias Asland, navigable, from the River Ribble, to Wigan, in the County Palatine of Lancaster.
Ouse Navigation Act 1719	6 Geo. 1. c. 29	7 April 1720
An Act for preserving and improving the Navigation of the River Ouse, in the County of Huntingdon.
Idle Navigation Act 1719	6 Geo. 1. c. 30	7 April 1720
An Act for making the River Idle navigable, from East Retford, in the County of Nottingham, to Bawtry Whars, in the County of York.

=== Private acts ===
Short title	Citation	Royal assent
Long title
Settlement and assurance of Orton and Bottle Bridge manors and other premises in Huntingdonshire to uses mentioned in Margarett Duchess of Newcastle's will.	6 Geo. 1. c. 1 Pr.	7 April 1720
An Act for settling and assuring the Manors of Orton and Bottlebridge, and other Premises, in the County of Huntingdon, to the several Uses mentioned in the Will of Margaret late Dutchess of Newcastle; and for other Purposes therein mentioned.
Earl of Hadington's Estate Act 1719	6 Geo. 1. c. 2 Pr.	7 April 1720
An Act for vesting Part of the Estate of Thomas Earl of Hadinton in Trustees, to be sold; and, with the Monies arising thereby, to purchase other Lands, of the like Value, to be settled to the same Uses.
Enabling Anne Walker alias Baugh (a minor), wife of Thomas Folliot Walker to sell and convey to William Conolly her share of lands in Ireland devised to her by Thomas Lord Folliot's will.	6 Geo. 1. c. 3 Pr.	7 April 1720
An Act to enable Anne Walker, alias Baughs, a Minor, the Wife of Thomas Folliot Walker Gentleman, to sell and convey unto the Right Honourable William Conolly Esquire and his Heirs her Share and Proportion of several Manors, Lands, Tenements, and Hereditaments, in the Kingdom of Ireland, devised to her by the last Will of Thomas late Lord Folliot, deceased; and for other Purposes therein mentioned.
Confirmation of a petition made between George Lord Carbery and Henry O'Brien of certain lands in Northamptonshire and Rutlandshire.	6 Geo. 1. c. 4 Pr.	7 April 1720
An Act for confirming a Partition made between the Right Honourable George Lord Carbery, Baron of Carbery in the Kingdom of Ireland, and Henry O Brien Esquire, of certain Manors, Lands, and Hereditaments, in the several Counties of Northampton and Rutland.
Baltonsborough Inclosure Act 1719	6 Geo. 1. c. 5 Pr.	7 April 1720
An Act for enclosing the Common called Baltonsbury Common, in the Parishes of Baltonsbury and Bradley, in the County of Somerset.
Dove's Estate Act 1719	6 Geo. 1. c. 6 Pr.	7 April 1720
An Act to enable Thomas Dove Esquire to raise Two Thousand Pounds upon his Estate at Upton, Sutton, Aylesworth, and Castor; and to make Sale of his Estate at Heathencoate, in the County of Northampton; for discharging Incumbrances upon the said Estates, raising of Portions for his Brother and Sister, and Payment of his Father's and his own Debts.
Eccleshall Inclosure Act 1719	6 Geo. 1. c. 7 Pr.	7 April 1720
An Act for enclosing the Heath and Common commonly called Gratwood Heath, in the Parish of Eccleshall, in the County of Stafford.
Enabling lessees and farmers of Daniel Whitby, prebendary of Teington Regis to make leases of copyhold lands of manors of Preston, alias Preston and Churchland, alias Parsons land (Devon).	6 Geo. 1. c. 8 Pr.	7 April 1720
An Act to enable the Lessees and Farmers of Daniel Whitby Doctor in Divinity, and Prebendary of the Prebend of Teington Regis, in the Cathedral Church of The Blessed Lady Mary the Virgin, of Sarum, and of all succeeding Prebendaries of the said Prebend for the Time being, to make Leases of the Copyhold Lands of the several Manors of Preston, alias Prestowne, and Church Land, alias The Parsons Land, in the County of Devon.
Making townships of Shipston and Tidmington a distinct parish from Tredington (Worcestershire) and dividing rectory of Tredington in three.	6 Geo. 1. c. 9 Pr.	7 April 1720
An Act for making the Townships of Shipston and Tidmington a distinct Parish from the Parish of Tredington, in the County and Diocese of Worcester; and for dividing the Rectory of the said Parish of Tredington into Three Parts.
Supplying the defects in, and better performance of, the will of Edmund Dunch.	6 Geo. 1. c. 10 Pr.	7 April 1720
An Act for supplying the Defects, and better Performance, of the Will of Edmund Dunch Esquire, deceased.
Discharging certain estates in Lincolnshire and Warwickshire from uses and limitations contained in marriage settlement of Sir William Keyte and for settling other lands in Gloucestershire.	6 Geo. 1. c. 11 Pr.	7 April 1720
An Act for discharging certain Estates, in the Counties of Lincoln and Warwick, of and from the Uses and Limitations contained in the Marriage Settlement of Sir William Keyt Baronet; and settling other Lands, in the County of Gloucester, of greater Value, to the same Uses.
Hales' Estate Act 1719	6 Geo. 1. c. 12 Pr.	7 April 1720
An Act for vesting the Estates of Sir John Hales and Sir Christopher Hales Baronets, deceased, in Trustees, to be sold, for raising Money, for the paying and discharging the Debts and Incumbrances charged thereupon, and affecting the same; and for other Purposes therein mentioned.
Chichester's Estate Act 1719	6 Geo. 1. c. 13 Pr.	7 April 1720
An Act for Sale of Part of the Estate of Sir John Chichester Baronet, for the Purposes therein mentioned.
Enabling Elizabeth Gomeldon and trustees to enter claims before Commissioners and trustees of forfeited estates and empowering them to hear and determine the same.	6 Geo. 1. c. 14 Pr.	7 April 1720
An Act to enable Elizabeth Gomeldon Widow and her Trustees to enter their respective Claims before the Commissioners and Trustees for the forfeited Estates; and to empower the said Commissioners and Trustees to hear and determine the same.
Broderick's Estate Act 1719	6 Geo. 1. c. 15 Pr.	7 April 1720
An Act to enable Lawrence Brodrick, an Infant, to perform certain Articles of Agreement entered into by Anne his Mother, since deceased, to whom he is Heir.
Sandford's Estate Act 1719	6 Geo. 1. c. 16 Pr.	7 April 1720
An Act to enable Trustees to sell Part of the Estate of John Sanford Esquire, deceased, for the Payment of his Debts and Legacies; and for other Purposes therein mentioned.
Pembroke's Estate Act 1719	6 Geo. 1. c. 17 Pr.	7 April 1720
An Act for Sale of the Estate of William Pemkroke, late of Portsmouth Dock, deceased, situate at North Mims, in the County of Hertford, for the Purposes therein mentioned.
Pendarves' Estate Act 1719	6 Geo. 1. c. 18 Pr.	7 April 1720
An Act for vesting the Estate of John Pendarves, late of Roscrow, in the County of Cornwall, Esquire, deceased, in new Trustees, to and for the same Uses, Intents, and Purposes, as are mentioned in his Will.
Rosier's Name Act 1719	6 Geo. 1. c. 19 Pr.	7 April 1720
An Act to enable John Rosier Esquire and his Issue to change their Surnames from Rosier to Reynolds.
Viscountess Howe's Naturalization Act 1719	6 Geo. 1. c. 20 Pr.	7 April 1720
An Act for the Naturalization of Mary Sophia Charlotte Viscountess Howe, Wife of Scroop Lord Viscount Howe of the Kingdom of Ireland.
Van Neck's Naturalization Act 1719	6 Geo. 1. c. 21 Pr.	7 April 1720
An Act for naturalizing Gerard Van Neck.
Hopfer's Naturalization Act 1719	6 Geo. 1. c. 22 Pr.	7 April 1720
An Act for naturalizing Bennet Erasmus Hopfer.
Naturalization of John Backer and George Kruger.	6 Geo. 1. c. 23 Pr.	7 April 1720
An Act for naturalizing John Backer and George Kruger.
Gampert's Naturalization Act 1719	6 Geo. 1. c. 24 Pr.	7 April 1720
An Act for naturalizing Samuel Gampert.
Naturalization of Cornelius Backer and Henry de Putter.	6 Geo. 1. c. 25 Pr.	7 April 1720
An Act for naturalizing Cornelius Backer and Henry de Putter.
Naturalization of Francis and John Van Hermert, Frederick Morgan and Henry Sander.	6 Geo. 1. c. 26 Pr.	7 April 1720
An Act for naturalizing Francis Van Hemert, John Van Hemert, Frederick Morgan, and Henry Nicholas Sander.
Henry Grutzman's Naturalization Act 1719	6 Geo. 1. c. 27 Pr.	7 April 1720
An Act for naturalizing John Henry Grutzman.
Nicholetts' Estate Act 1719	6 Geo. 1. c. 28 Pr.	12 April 1720
An Act for vesting the Estate late of Gilbert Nicholetts Esquire, deceased, in Trustees, for Payment of his Debts, and Sisters Portions; and for making Provision for his Widow and Child.
Shrewsbury Estate Act 1720	6 Geo. 1. c. 29 Pr.	11 June 1720
An Act for annexing the late Duke of Shrewsbury's Estate to the Earldom of Shrewsbury, and confirming Gilbert Earl of Shrewsbury's Settlement in order thereto; and for other Purposes therein mentioned.
Estates of Bishopric of London and Charles Earl of Peterborough and Monmouth: exchange of several small parcels of lands in the parish and manor of Fulham.	6 Geo. 1. c. 30 Pr.	11 June 1720
An Act for exchanging of several small Parcels of Land, in the Parish and Manor of Fulham, belonging to the Bishopric of London, for other Lands, of greater Value, to Charles Earl of Peterborow and Monmouth, and his Heirs.
Enabling any corporations within University of Cambridge, or any other persons, to sell and convey messuages and ground to the university for enlarging their public library.	6 Geo. 1. c. 31 Pr.	11 June 1720
An Act to enable any Corporations within the University of Cambridge, or any other Persons, to sell and convey any Messuages and Ground to the said University, for enlarging their Public Library.
Church of St. Martin-in-the Fields Act 1719 (repealed)	6 Geo. 1. c. 32 Pr.	11 June 1720
An Act for rebuilding the Parish Church of Saint Martin in the Fields, in the City of Westminster, at the Charge of the Inhabitants of the said Parish. (Repealed by London Government (City of Westminster) Order in Council 1901 (SR&O 1901/278))
Bamfylde's Estate Act 1719	6 Geo. 1. c. 33 Pr.	11 June 1720
An Act for Sale of Part of the Estate of Sir Coplestone Warwick Bampfylde Baronet; and for settling another Estate, of greater Value, to the same Uses.
Lumley's Estate Act 1719 (repealed)	6 Geo. 1. c. 34 Pr.	11 June 1720
An Act to enable Sir James Lumley Baronet to settle a competent Jointure; and for other Purposes therein mentioned. (Repealed by Lumley's Estate Act 1725 (12 Geo. 1. c. 22))
Naturalization of Philip Germain and George Hallmans.	6 Geo. 1. c. 35 Pr.	11 June 1720
An Act for naturalizing Philip Germain and George Hollmans.
Angell's Naturalization Act 1719	6 Geo. 1. c. 36 Pr.	11 June 1720
An Act for naturalizing George Angell.

=== Sources ===
- Pickering, Danby, ed. (1765). "Anno sexto Georgii I". The Statutes at Large. Vol. 14: From the Fifth to the Ninth Year of King George I. Cambridge: Joseph Bentham. pp. 128–298 – via Internet Archive.
- Pickering, Danby, ed. (1765). "Anno sexto Georgii I". The Statutes at Large. Vol. 14: From the Fifth to the Ninth Year of King George I. Cambridge: Joseph Bentham. pp. 128–298 – via Google Books.
- Pickering, Danby, ed. (1765). "Anno sexto Georgii I". The Statutes at Large. Vol. 14: From the Fifth to the Ninth Year of King George I. Cambridge: Joseph Bentham. pp. 128–298 – via Internet Archive.
- Journals of the House of Commons. Vol. 19. London: His Majesty's Stationery Office. 1803. pp. 165–376 – via Google Books.
- Chronological Table of and Index to the Statutes. Vol. 1: To the End of the Session 59 Vict. Sess. 2 (1895) (13th ed.). London: Her Majesty's Stationery Office. 1896. p. 95 – via Google Books.

== See also ==
- List of acts of the Parliament of Great Britain
