= Kingdom of Ireland =

Dependency of England and then of Great Britain (1542–1800)

Kingdom of Ireland Ríocht na hÉireann (Irish)
- 1542–1800; 1652–1660: Commonwealth
- Top: Royal banner Bottom: alternative flag (from 1782) Coat of arms (Note: See coat of arms regarding use of a crowned harp as the arms of Ireland. Although numerous flags of Ireland existed during the period, the Kingdom of Ireland had no official flag or arms. See List of flags of Ireland.)

- The Kingdom of Ireland in 1789; other realms in personal union are in light green
- Status: Dependency of England (1542–1707); Dependency of Great Britain (1707–1800)
- Capital: Dublin; 53°21′N 6°16′W
- Common languages: Official languages: English (Early Modern English, Fingallian, Yola); Latin and Law French (used in court until 1737); Majority language: Irish; Minority languages: Ulster Scots (since the 17th century)
- Religion: Anglican (state-official); Catholic (majority); Presbyterian (primarily in Ulster)
- Government: Unitary parliamentary constitutional monarchy
- Monarch
  - 1542–1547 (first): Henry VIII
  - 1760–1800 (last): George III
- Lord Lieutenant
  - 1542–1548 (first): Anthony St Leger
  - 1798–1800 (last): Charles Cornwallis
- Chief Secretary
  - 1660 (first): Matthew Locke
  - 1798–1800 (last): Robert Stewart
- Legislature: Parliament
  - Upper house: House of Lords
  - Lower house: House of Commons
- History
  - Crown of Ireland Act: 18 June 1542
  - Treaty of Mellifont: 30 March 1603
  - Confederate Wars: 1641–1653
  - Commonwealth: 1652–1660
  - Legislative independence: 1782–1783
  - Act of Union: 31 December 1800
- Currency: Irish pound
Preceded by	Succeeded by
Lordship of Ireland	Irish Republic (1798); United Kingdom of Great Britain and Ireland
- Today part of: Republic of Ireland; United Kingdom; Northern Ireland

The Kingdom of Ireland (Note: Early Modern Irish: Ríoghacht Éireann; Modern Irish: Ríocht na hÉireann, pronounced [ənˠ ˌɾˠiːxt̪ˠ ˈeːɾʲən̪ˠ]) was a dependency of England from 1542 to 1707, and then of Great Britain from 1707 to 1800. It was ruled by the monarchs of England and then of Great Britain in personal union, and was administered from Dublin Castle by a viceroy appointed by the English king: the Lord Lieutenant of Ireland. By the late 17th century, the state was dominated by the Protestant Anglo-Irish minority, known as the Protestant Ascendancy. The Protestant Church of Ireland was the state church. The Parliament of Ireland was almost exclusively Anglo-Irish. From 1661, the administration controlled an Irish army. Although formally a kingdom in personal union on equal footing with England and later Great Britain, for most of its history it was de facto a dependency. This status was enshrined in the Declaratory Act 1719.

The territory of the kingdom comprised that of the former Lordship of Ireland, founded in 1177 by King Henry II of England after the Anglo-Norman invasion of Ireland. By the 16th century, the Pale, the area of effective English rule, had shrunk greatly; most of Ireland was held by Gaelic nobles as minor principalities notionally subject to the English king but independent in practice. By the terms of the Crown of Ireland Act 1542, Henry VIII of England became "King of Ireland", theoretically elevating Ireland to coequal status with England, as a kingdom in personal union. There followed an expansion of English control during the Tudor conquest. This sparked the Desmond Rebellions and the Nine Years' War. The conquest of the island was completed early in the 17th century. It involved the confiscation of land from the native Irish Catholics and its colonisation by Protestant settlers from Britain. Most Catholic countries at the time did not recognise Protestant monarchs as legitimate kings of Ireland (or indeed of England), instead supporting the Jacobite government-in-exile from 1688 onwards.

For most of the kingdom's history, the Irish Catholic majority suffered legal discrimination: under the penal laws, Catholicism was suppressed and Catholics were barred from government, parliament, the military, and most public offices. This was one of the main drivers behind the Irish Confederate Wars (1641–1653), during which the Irish Catholic Confederates controlled most of Ireland. After the Cromwellian conquest, Ireland suffered harsh conditions under the Protectorate (1653–1659). The brief reign of Catholic king James II (1685–1689) led to the Williamite War (1689–1691). The Williamite victory strengthened the Protestant Ascendancy, and the kingdom had only Protestant monarchs thereafter.

In the 1780s, the parliament gained some independence, and some anti-Catholic laws were lifted. This sparked sectarian conflict in County Armagh. Following the failed republican Irish Rebellion of 1798, the parliament of Ireland and parliament of Great Britain passed the Acts of Union 1800. This created, on 1 January 1801, the United Kingdom of Great Britain and Ireland and the Parliament of the United Kingdom.

== History ==
=== Background ===
In 1170 and 1171, Anglo-Norman lords conquered swathes of territory from the Gaelic Irish. King Henry II of England arrived in Ireland with a large army in 1171. The Anglo-Norman lords, several Irish kings, and the Irish church leadership submitted to him. Pope Adrian IV had allegedly issued a papal bull, Laudabiliter, granting Henry the right to invade Ireland to enforce the Gregorian Reform. The 1175 Treaty of Windsor acknowledged Henry as overlord of the conquered lands, and the High King of Ireland, Ruaidrí Ua Conchobair, as overlord of the rest of Ireland. However, in 1177 Henry made his son John "Lord of Ireland" and encouraged his subordinates to conquer more land. Thereafter, the kings of England claimed lordship over the whole island, but in reality the king's rule only ever extended to parts of the island. The rest of Ireland – later referred to as Gaelic Ireland – remained under the control of various Gaelic Irish kingdoms or chiefdoms, who were often at war with the Anglo-Normans.

From the mid-15th century, direct English rule in Ireland was limited to a region on the east coast called "the English Pale". Many Anglo-Norman lords "beyond the Pale" had become Gaelicized.

When Pope Clement VII excommunicated the king of England, Henry VIII, in 1533, the constitutional position of the lordship in Ireland became uncertain. Henry had broken away from the Holy See and declared himself the head of the Church in England. He had petitioned Rome to procure an annulment of his marriage to Catherine of Aragon. Clement VII refused Henry's request and Henry subsequently refused to recognise the Roman Catholic Church's vestigial sovereignty over Ireland, and was excommunicated again in late 1538 by Pope Paul III. The Treason Act (Ireland) 1537 was passed to counteract this.

=== Tudor Ireland ===
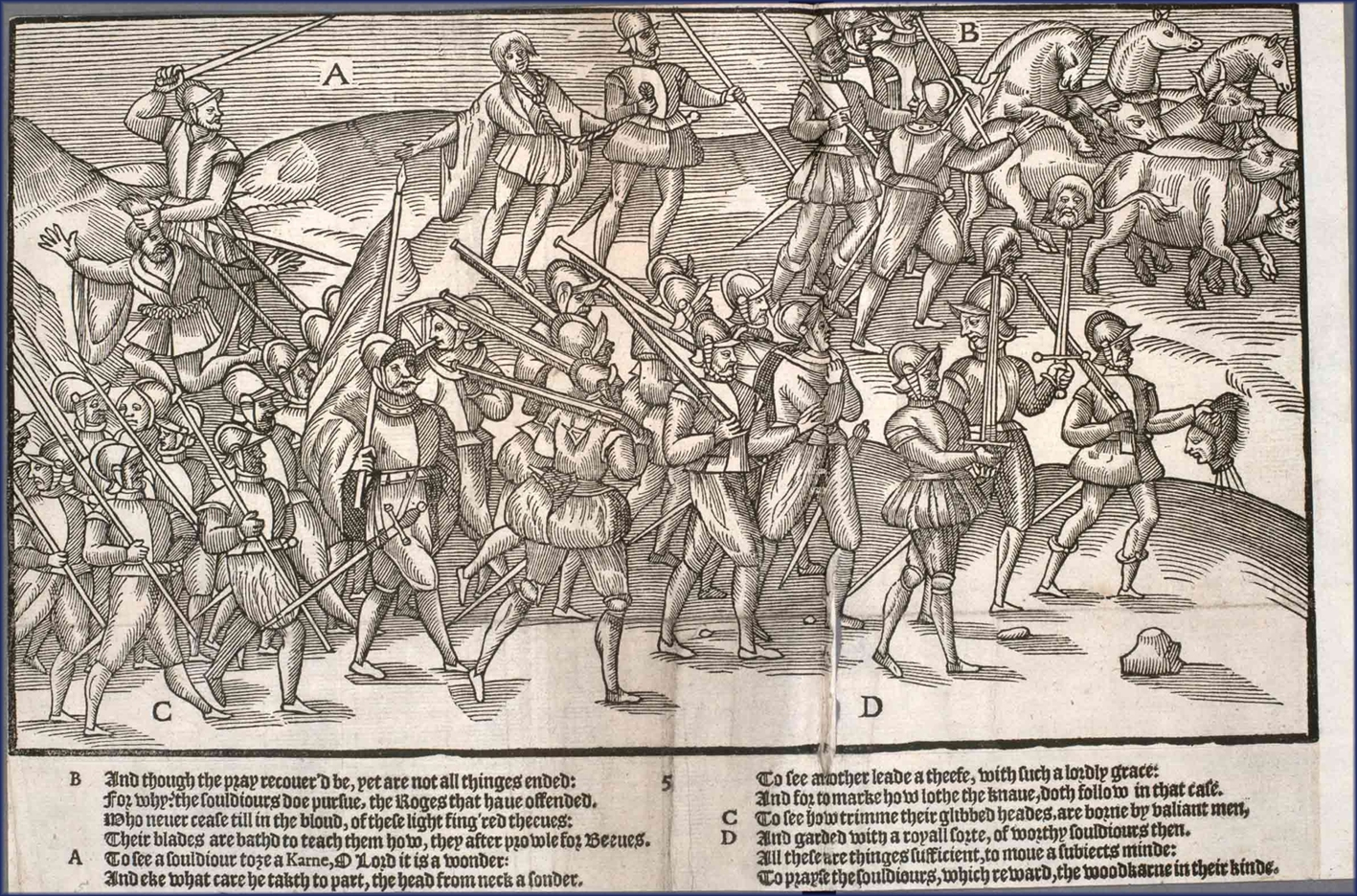
English soldiers return from a battle with cattle, severed Irish heads, and Irish captives, from The Image of Irelande, 1581

Following the failed revolt of Silken Thomas in 1534–1535, Grey, the lord deputy, had some military successes against several clans in the late 1530s, and took their submissions. By 1540 most of Ireland seemed at peace and under the control of the king's Dublin administration; a situation that was not to last for long.

In 1542, the Kingdom of Ireland was established by the Parliament of Ireland through the Crown of Ireland Act. This act declared King Henry VIII of England as the King of Ireland, thus creating a separate political entity known as the Kingdom of Ireland. The act marked a significant shift in Ireland's political landscape, as it sought to consolidate English control over the island and bring it under closer royal governance. The Kingdom of Ireland existed alongside the Lordship of Ireland, which was held by the English monarchs prior to the establishment of the kingdom. The new kingdom was not recognised by the Catholic monarchies in Europe. After the death of Edward VI, Henry's son, the papal bull of 1555 recognised the Roman Catholic Mary I as Queen of Ireland. The link of "personal union" of the Crown of Ireland to the Crown of England became enshrined in Catholic canon law. In this fashion, the Kingdom of Ireland was ruled by the reigning monarch of England. This placed the new Kingdom of Ireland in personal union with the Kingdom of England.

In line with its expanded role and self-image, the administration established the King's Inns for barristers in 1541, and the Ulster King of Arms to regulate heraldry in 1552. Proposals to establish a university in Dublin were delayed until 1592.

In 1593 war broke out, as Hugh O'Neill, Earl of Tyrone, led a confederation of Irish lords and Spain against the crown, in what later became known as the Nine Years' War. A series of stunning Irish victories brought English power in Ireland to the point of collapse by the beginning of 1600, but a renewed campaign under Charles Blount, Lord Mountjoy forced Tyrone to submit in 1603, completing the Tudor conquest of Ireland.

=== Stuart Ireland ===
In 1603 James VI King of Scots became James I of England and Ireland, uniting the Kingdoms of England, Scotland and Ireland in a personal union. James established the Plantation of Ulster in 1606, the largest of all English and Scottish plantations in Ireland. It had a lasting legacy; into the 20th century, most of Ulster had a Protestant and Pro-Union majority in its population.

The political order of the kingdom was interrupted by the Wars of the Three Kingdoms starting in 1639. During the subsequent interregnum period, England, Scotland and Ireland were ruled as a republic until 1660. This period saw the rise of the loyalist Irish Catholic Confederation within the kingdom and, from 1653, the creation of the republican Commonwealth of England, Scotland and Ireland. The kingdom's order was restored 1660 with the restoration of Charles II. Without any public dissent, Charles's reign was backdated to his father's execution in 1649.

=== Grattan's Patriots ===
Poynings' Law was repealed in 1782 in what came to be known as the Constitution of 1782, granting Ireland legislative independence. Parliament in this period came to be known as Grattan's Parliament, after the principal Irish leader of the period, Henry Grattan. Although Ireland had legislative independence, executive administration remained under the control of the executive of the Kingdom of Great Britain. In 1788–1789 a Regency crisis arose when King George III became ill. Grattan wanted to appoint the Prince of Wales, later George IV, as Regent of Ireland. The king recovered before this could be enacted.

=== United Irishmen ===
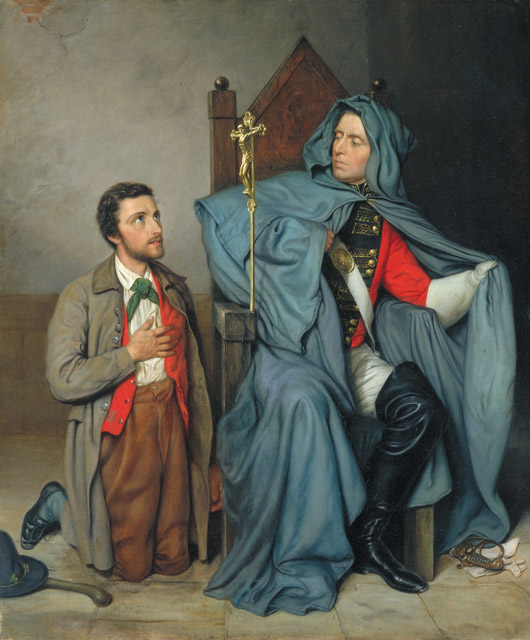
Charlotte Schreiber's The Croppy Boy (1879), relating to the United Irishmen's Wexford Rebellion and inspired by the ballad of the same name. A man, likely a rebel from his green cravat, kneels for the sacrament of penitence before a British soldier disguised as a Catholic priest, inadvertently outing himself as a rebel.

The Irish Rebellion of 1798, and the rebels' alliance with Great Britain's longtime enemy the French, led to a push to bring Ireland formally into the British Union. By the Acts of Union 1800, voted for by both Irish and British Parliaments, the Kingdom of Ireland merged on 1 January 1801 with the Kingdom of Great Britain to form the United Kingdom of Great Britain and Ireland. The Irish Parliament ceased to exist, though the executive, presided over by the Lord Lieutenant, remained in place until 1922.

== Viceroy ==
The Kingdom of Ireland was governed by a Lord Deputy or viceroy. The post was held by senior nobles such as Thomas Radcliffe. From 1688 the title was usually Lord Lieutenant. In the absence of a Lord Deputy, lords justices ruled. While some Irishmen held the post, most of the lords deputy were English noblemen. While the viceroy controlled the Irish administration as the monarch's representative, in the eighteenth century the political post of Chief Secretary for Ireland became increasingly powerful.

== Parliament ==
The kingdom's legislature was bicameral with a House of Lords and a House of Commons. By the terms of Poynings' Law (1494) and other acts, the parliament's powers were greatly circumscribed. The legislature was content to "rubber stamp" acts or "suggestions" from the English parliament.

Roman Catholics and dissenters, mostly Presbyterians, Baptists, and Methodists, were excluded from membership of the Irish parliament from 1693. Furthermore, their rights were restricted by a series of laws called the Penal Laws. They were denied voting rights from 1728 until 1793. The Grattan Parliament succeeded in achieving the repeal of Poynings' Law in 1782. This allowed progressive legislation and gradual liberalisation was effected. Catholics and Dissenters were given the right to vote in 1793, but Catholics were still excluded from the Irish Parliament and senior public offices in the kingdom. As in Great Britain and the rest of Europe, voting and membership of parliament was restricted to property owners. In the 1720s, the parliament was housed in a new building at College Green, Dublin.

== Army ==
The Kingdom maintained a standing force, the Irish Army; it was for much of its existence the largest force available to the British Crown, being substantially larger than the English Army and Scots Army.

The modern Irish Army does not trace its lineage to the army of the Kingdom of Ireland.

== Church of Ireland ==
Trinity College Dublin was founded by the Elizabethans to serve as the organ of the Anglican intelligentsia.

When Henry VIII was excommunicated by the Catholic Church in 1538, all but two of the bishops in the island of Ireland followed the doctrine of the Church of England, although almost no clergy or laity did so. Having paid their Annates to the Papacy, the bishops had no reason to step down, and in the 1530s nobody knew how long the reformation would last. Unlike Henry VIII, this hierarchy was not excommunicated by the Papacy. They retained control of what became the State Church of the new Kingdom in 1542. As the established church, it retained possession of most Church property (including a great repository of religious architecture and other items, though some were later destroyed). In 1553, Irish Catholics were heartened by the coronation of Queen Mary I. In 1555, she persuaded the Pope to recognise the Kingdom in the papal bull "Ilius".

In 1558, a Protestant – Elizabeth I – ascended the throne. With the exception of James II of England, all the following monarchs adhered to Anglicanism. Contrary to the official plan, the substantial majority of the population remained strongly Roman Catholic, despite the political and economic advantages of membership of the state church. Despite its numerical minority, however, the Church of Ireland remained the official state church until it was disestablished on 1 January 1871 by the Liberal government under William Ewart Gladstone.

== Ethnic conflict ==
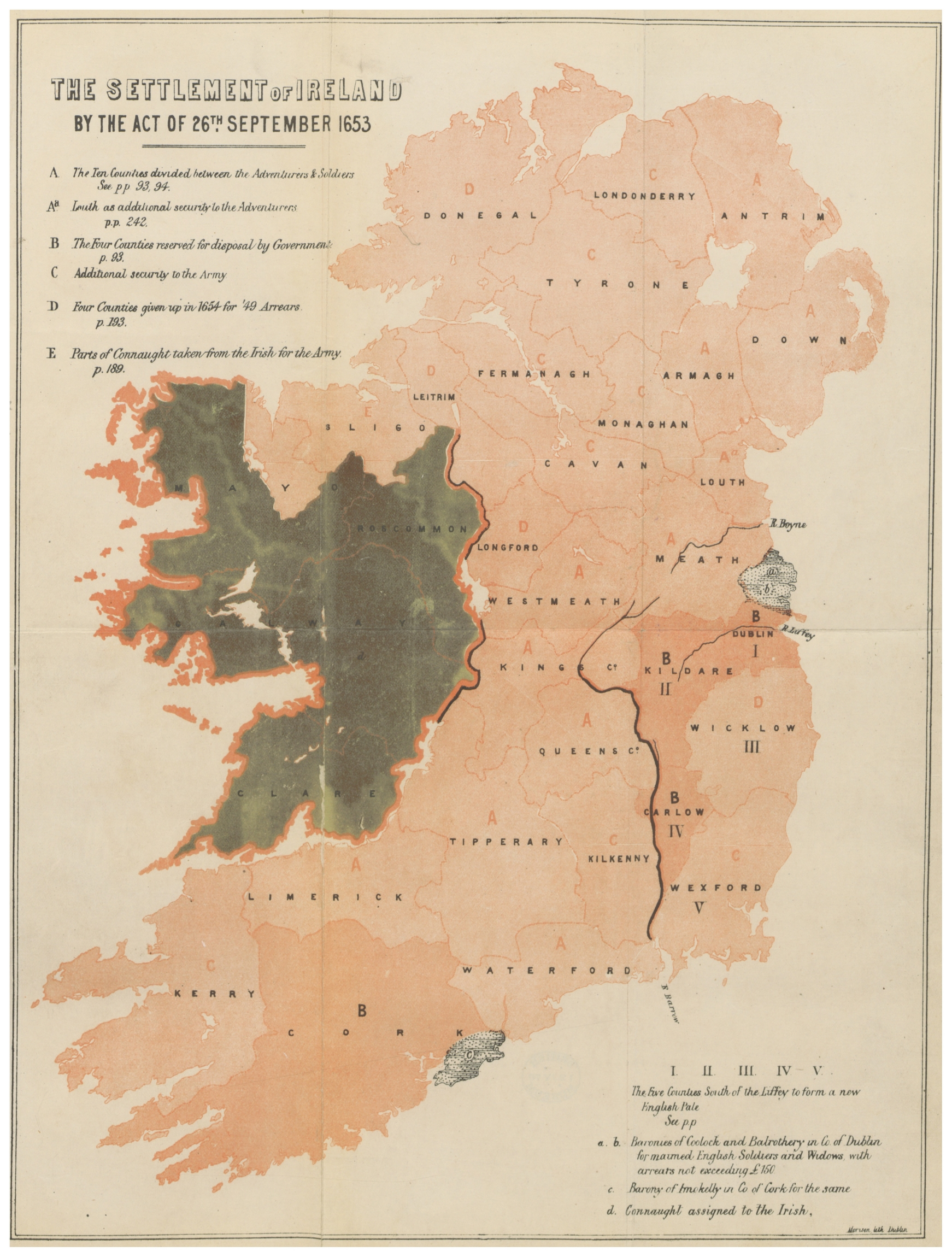
After Cromwell's victory, huge areas of land were confiscated from the Gaelic nobility and the Irish Catholics were banished to the lands of Connacht.

The legacy of the Kingdom of Ireland remains a bone of contention in Irish-British relations to this day because of the constant ethnic conflict between the native Irish inhabitants and primarily the new Anglo-Irish settlers across the island. Their background espoused English culture (law, language, dress, religion, economic relations and definitions of land ownership) in Ireland as it later did across much of what was to become the British Empire. However Gaelic culture and Irish language, was maintained to a significant extent by the majority of the original native population. Sometimes this was presented as "barbaric", "savage" which later was perceived by the native population as a mark of undesirability in respect of maintaining and learning the language. While the Lordship of Ireland had existed since the 12th century and nominally owed allegiance to the English monarchy, many kingdoms of Gaelic Ireland continued to exist; this came to an end with the Kingdom of Ireland, where the whole island was brought under the centralised control of an Anglo-centric system based in Dublin. This phase of Irish history marked the beginning of an officially organised policy of settler colonialism, orchestrated from London and the incorporation of Ireland into the British Empire (indeed Ireland is sometimes called "England's first colony"). The theme is prominently addressed in Irish postcolonial literature.

The religion of the native majority and its clergy – the Catholic Church – was actively persecuted by the state. A set of Penal Laws favoured those who adhered to the established church – the Church of Ireland. They oppressed those native Irish who refused to abjure their religion. A similar experience happened to English, Scottish and Welsh Catholics during the same period. There is some perception that during Tudor times, elements within the government at times engaged in and advanced a genocidal policy against the Irish Gaels, while during the Plantations of Ireland (particularly successful in Ulster) the local population were displaced in a project of ethnic cleansing where regions of Ireland became de-Gaelicised. This in turn led to bloody retaliations, which drag on to modern times. Some of the native inhabitants, including their leadership, were permitted to flee into exile from the country following ending up on the losing side in conflicts (i.e. the Flight of the Earls and the Flight of the Wild Geese) or in the case of the Cromwellian regime were forced into indentured servitude (although the same happened to English persons involved in the Cromwellian regime) in the Caribbean, following mass land confiscation for the benefit of New English settlers.

On the other hand, the fact that the kingdom had been a unitary state gave Irish nationalists in 1912–1922 a reason to expect that in the process of increasing self-government the island of Ireland would be treated as a single political unit.

== Coat of arms ==
Coat of arms with the crest

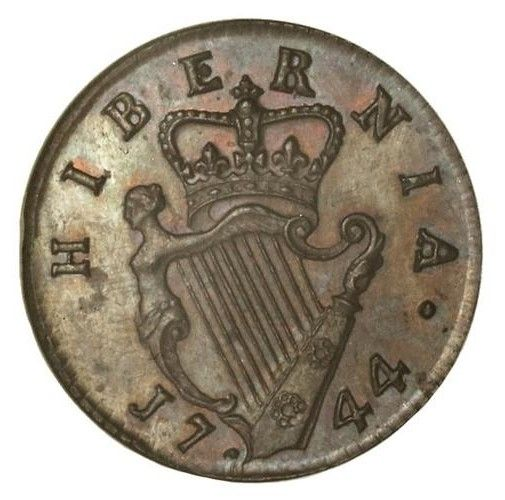
Crowned harp on a farthing coin of 1744

The arms of the Kingdom of Ireland were blazoned: Azure, a harp Or stringed Argent. These earliest arms of Ireland are described in an entry that reads: Le Roi d'Irlande, D'azur à la harpe d'or, in a 13th-century French roll of arms, the Armorial Wijnbergen, also known as the Wijnbergen Roll, said to be preserved in The Hague, in the Netherlands but currently untraced; a copy is held in the Royal Library of Belgium (Collection Goethals, ms. 2569). This may have been an aspirational depiction for a putative High-King, for it was not related to the Lordship of Ireland at that time by the English king, who only assumed the title "King of Ireland" later in the reign of Henry VIII

A crown was not part of the arms but use of a crowned harp was apparently common as a badge or as a device. A crowned harp also appeared as a crest although the delineated crest was: a wreath Or and Azure, a tower (sometime triple-towered) Or, from the port, a hart springing Argent.

King James not only used the harp crowned as the device of Ireland, but quartered the harp in this royal achievement for the arms of that kingdom, in the third quarter of the royal achievement upon his Great Seal, as it has continued ever since. The blazon was azure, a harp or stringed argent, as appears by the great embroidered banner, and at the funeral of Queen Anne, King James' queen, AD 1618, and likewise by the great banner and banner of Ireland at the funeral of King James. The difference between the arms and device of Ireland appears to be on the crown only, which is added to the harp when used as a device.

At the funeral of King James was likewise carried the standard of the crest of Ireland, a buck proper (argent in the draught) issuing from a tower triple towered or, which is the only instance of this crest that I have met with, and therefore was probably devised and assigned for the crest of Ireland upon occasion of this funeral, but with what propriety I do not understand.

— John Martin-Leake, quoted in Notes and Queries, vol. 12, 1855, p. 350

The insignia of Ireland have variously been given by early writers. In the reign of Edward IV, a commission appointed to enquire what were the arms of Ireland found them to be three crowns in pale. It has been supposed that these crowns were abandoned at the Reformation, from an idea that they might denote the feudal sovereignty of the pope, whose vassal the king of England was, as lord of Ireland. However, in a manuscript in the Heralds' College of the time of Henry VII, the arms of Ireland are blazoned azure, a harp or, stringed argent; and when they were for the first time placed on the royal shield on the accession of James I. they were thus delineated: the crest is on a wreath or and azure, a tower (sometime triple-towered) or, from the port, a hart springing argent. Another crest is a harp or. The national flag of Ireland exhibits the harp in a field vert. The royal badge of Ireland, as settled by sign-manual in 1801 is a harp, or, stringed argent, and a trefoil vert, both ensigned with the imperial crown.

— Chambers' Encyclopædia: A Dictionary of Universal Knowledge, 1868, p. 627
