= Poynings' Law (on certification of acts) =

1494 law subordinating the Irish parliament to England

- Act of Parliament
- Parliament of Ireland
- Long title: An Act that no Parliament be holden in this Land until the Acts be certified into England.
- Citation: 10 Hen. 7. c. 4 (I) (The Irish Statutes numbering); 10 Hen. 7. c. 9 (I) (Analecta Hibernica numbering)
- Introduced by: Probably Sir Edward Poynings, Lord Deputy of Ireland
- Territorial extent: Ireland

Dates
- Commencement: 1 December 1494
- Repealed: 13 August 1878

Other legislation
- Amended by: Constitution of 1782; Acts of Union 1800
- Repealed by: Statute Law Revision (Ireland) Act 1878

Status: Repealed

Text of statute as originally enacted

Poynings' Law or the Statute of Drogheda (10 Hen. 7. c. 4 (I) [The Irish Statutes numbering] or 10 Hen. 7. c. 9 (I) [Analecta Hibernica numbering]; later titled "An Act that no Parliament be holden in this Land until the Acts be certified into England") was a 1494 Act of the Parliament of Ireland which provided that the parliament could not meet until its proposed legislation had been approved both by Ireland's Lord Deputy and Privy Council and by England's monarch (the Lord of Ireland) and Privy Council. It was a major grievance in 18th-century Ireland, was amended by the Constitution of 1782, rendered moot by the Acts of Union 1800, and repealed by the Statute Law Revision (Ireland) Act 1878 (41 & 42 Vict. c. 57).

== Background ==
Poynings' Parliament was called by Sir Edward Poynings in his capacity as Lord Deputy of Ireland, appointed by King Henry VII of England in his capacity as Lord of Ireland. Coming in the aftermath of the divisive Wars of the Roses, Poynings' intention was to make Ireland once again obedient to the English monarchy. Assembling the Parliament of Ireland on 1 December 1494, he declared that it was thereafter to be placed under the authority of the Parliament of England. This marked the beginning of Tudor direct rule in Ireland, although Henry VII was still forced to rely on Old English nobles (such as Gerald FitzGerald, 8th Earl of Kildare, despite his support for Lambert Simnel) as his deputies in Ireland through the intervening years. Poynings' Law was a major rallying point for later groups seeking self-government for Ireland, particularly the Confederate Catholics in the 1640s and Henry Grattan's Patriot Party in the late 18th century, who consistently sought a repeal of Poynings' Law. The Act remained in place until the Constitution of 1782 gave the Irish parliament legislative independence.

== Function and operation ==
The working of Poynings' Law took place in several steps. The first step was for the lieutenant governor and the Irish council (or Irish executive) to decide that a parliament was needed, usually for the purpose of raising funds. At this point, the council and lieutenant would write drafts of legislation to be proposed to the king and his council. After this had been completed, the lieutenant and council, according to the act, were required to certify the request for parliament "under the great seal of that land [Ireland]”, and then forward it to England for approval. Once the request arrived in England, it was reviewed by the King and his council, and a formal licence, approving the request for parliament and the draft bills were returned to Ireland. Once the licence was received in Ireland, the governor would summon parliament, and the bills passed. "Government" was not representative as in the modern sense and there was no sustained opposition. Parliament's consent was necessary for some purposes, and it frequently offered advice, but the decisions were made by the English and Irish councils. This is an important fact to consider when examining exactly who the law was aimed to suppress. As the point above demonstrates, parliament was virtually a rubber stamp, and it was the Irish executive who made the actual decisions in proposing policy.

The two important aspects of the procedure presented by Poynings' Law are transmission and certification. Both of these requirements placed limits on various parties within the law-making process in Ireland. The combination of these processes created a situation where bills could be sent, along with the request for parliament, and the king could amend and remove such bills as he wished, however, he could not add new bills himself. This is a result of the certification process which requires the submission to be made by the Irish council "under the great seal of that land [Ireland]". The original intention of the certification process was to remove the capacity of initiating legislation from the parliament, and place it with the Irish council and governor. But as a result of the way it was framed in the act, it also removed that capacity from the English parliament and administration as well: legislation could only be submitted for approval by the Irish executive.

Furthermore, the two processes made it impossible for the Irish to add more bills or amendments to a request after the initial licence request had been granted. This meant that any additional bills or amendments that they wished to pass in parliament would have to be re-sent along with an entirely new request for parliament. Clearly, this created severe inefficiencies in the legislative process, and thus gave the executive in Ireland as well as the crown an interest in relaxing procedure. As early as 1496 "the rigid procedure laid down by Poynings' Law was not being adhered to", and additional bills were commonly sent to England after the original request and were returned to Ireland before the meeting of a new parliament. The example from 1496 was the separate request for parliamentary licence and sending of bills in the reappointment of the Earl of Kildare. At this time, because the rigid procedure of Poynings' Law was not in the interest of any of the parties involved, especially the Crown and Irish executive, Quinn argues that "no hesitation was felt about transmitting additional bills" after the licence had been granted.

== Changes after 1692 ==
After the Revolution of 1688 and the ensuing Williamite War, an important development in the Poynings' Law procedure took place in the 1692 parliament as some members of the Irish House of Commons sought to establish for themselves a more central role in the process of drafting legislature. On 27 October 1692, the House of Commons passed two notable resolutions. The first, "that it was, and is, the undoubted right of the commons… to prepare and resolve the ways and means of raising money" and the second, "that it was, and is, the sole and undoubted right of the commons to prepare heads of bills for raising money". Opposition to the executive was then expressed as the Commons used its veto power under Poynings' Law to reject "virtually two-thirds of the meticulously prepared government bills". Political deadlock ensued and parliament was prorogued. Although judicial opinion in both Ireland and England served to vindicate the position of the Lord Lieutenant and the English Government in the matter, it became clear that a compromise solution must be reached before parliament could be called again. From mid-1694, negotiations to this end began to bear fruit. The Irish parliament would pass one government money bill relating to excise at the beginning of the session in recognition of the royal prerogative. The parliament would now appoint a committee to decide upon the "ways and means" of raising supply and draw up the "heads of bills" of any related legislation. Government support of penal legislation against Catholics also helped placate the claims of the 'sole right' advocates. The compromise solution was put into effect in the 1695 parliament and all fourteen government bills presented in the first session were passed by both houses. Now the Irish House of Commons had major input into the substance, or 'heads', of supply bills that would then be transmitted to the English Privy Council for approval, amendment or rejection under the Poynings' Law procedure. This set the precedent for the parliaments of the eighteenth century.

== Heads of bills ==
Whereas an independent legislature can amend a bill between the time of its introduction and the time it is passed, this was not possible for the Parliament of Ireland, as only the bill originally introduced would be in compliance with the requirement under Poynings' Law to have been pre-approved by the privy councils. As a consequence, a legal fiction developed after the Revolution of 1688 whereby the Irish parliament introduced and debated the 'heads' of a bill before transmitting the heads to the Irish Privy Council. In theory, the 'heads' of a bill are simply its broad outline or general scheme; in practice, they were identical in form to a final bill, and processed identically, except that the enacting clause "be it enacted" was replaced with "we pray that it may be enacted". On occasion, if either privy council amended a bill, the Irish parliament would symbolically assert its authority by rejecting the amended bill and resubmitting heads of a new bill identical to the rejected one.

== Amendment and repeal ==
The Declaratory Act 1719 declared the right of the Parliament of Great Britain to make laws for Ireland and overrule judgments of the Irish House of Lords. The Declaratory Act and Poynings' Law were two major grievances of the Irish Patriot Party that were addressed by the Constitution of 1782. One element of the Constitution was Barry Yelverton's Act, an implied amendment of Poynings' Law which removed the Irish Privy Council altogether from the legislative process and reduced the British Privy Council's power to one of veto rather than amendment. The Acts of Union 1800 rendered most of the Constitution of 1782 and Poynings' Law moot. Poynings' Law was formally repealed as obsolete by the Statute Law Revision (Ireland) Act 1878.

== Sources ==
Primary

- The Statutes at Large, passed in the Parliaments held in Ireland. Vol. 1: From the third year of Edward the Second, A.D. 1310, to the eleventh, twelfth and thirteenth years of James the First, A.D. 1612, inclusive. Boulter Grierson. 1765. (Where two chapters are given, the first is the printed number, the second the enrolled number.)
  - 10 Hen. 7. c. 4 (c. 9) (p. 44)
  - 10 Hen. 7. c. 22 (c. 39) (pp. 56–57)
  - 28 Hen. 8. c. 4 (pp. 89–90)
  - 28 Hen. 8. c. 20 (c. 31) (pp. 157–159)
  - 3 & 4 Ph. & M. c.4 (c. 11) (pp. 246–248)
  - 11 Eliz. 1 Sess. 3 c. 8 (c. 18) (pp. 346–347)
- Irish Statute Book
  - Statute Law Revision (Ireland) Act, 1878

Secondary

- Bartlett, Thomas; Hayton, David, eds. (1979), Penal Era and Golden Age, Belfast: Ulster Historical Foundation, ISBN 0-901905-23-2.
- Bradshaw, Brendan (1979), The Irish Constitutional Revolution of the Sixteenth Century, Cambridge: Cambridge University Press, ISBN 0-521-22206-0.
- Curtis, E.; McDowell, R.B., eds. (1968), "Poynings' Law", Irish Historical Documents 1172–1922, London: Methuen & Company Limited, p. 83.
- Ellis, Steven G. (1985), 'Tudor Ireland: Crown, Community and the Conflict of Cultures 1470–1603, New York: Longman, ISBN 0-582-49341-2.
- Hayden, Mary T. (1925). "The Origin and Development of Heads of Bills in the Irish Parliament". The Journal of the Royal Society of Antiquaries of Ireland. 15 (2): 112–125. ISSN 0035-9106. JSTOR 25513369.
- McGrath, Charles Ivar (2000), The Making of the Eighteenth Century Irish Constitution, Dublin: Four Courts Press, ISBN 1-85182-554-1.
- Pack, Mark (2001), "Charles James Fox, the Repeal of Poynings Law, and the Act of Union: 1782–1801" (PDF), Journal of Liberal History, 33, archived from the original (PDF) on 26 March 2009.
- Porritt, Edward; Porritt, Annie (1909). "Poynings' Law". The Unreformed House of Commons; Parliamentary representation before 1832. Vol. 2: Scotland and Ireland. Cambridge University Press. pp. 424–449.
- Quinn, D.B. (1941), "The early interpretation of Poynings' Law, 1494–1534", Irish Historical Studies, 2 (7): 241–254, doi:10.1017/S002112140011212X, JSTOR 30005898.
- Richardson, H.G. (Henry Gerald); Sayles, G.O. (1964). "Poynings Law". The Irish Parliament in the Middle Ages. Philadelphia: University of Pennsylvania Press. pp. 269–281.
- "Background to the Statutes: The Constitutional Position". History of the Irish Parliament. Ulster Historical Foundation.
