= Eiríkur =

Eiríkur is an Icelandic masculine given name. Notable people with the name include:

- Eirikur Gilstón Corfitz Andersen (born 1984), Faroese musician
- Eiríkur Benedikz (1907–1988), Icelandic scholar
- Eirikur Bergmann (born 1969), Icelandic academic and writer
- Eiríkur Björn Björgvinsson (born 1966), Icelandic politician
- Eiríkur Hauksson (born 1959), Icelandic heavy metal vocalist
- Eiríkur Magnússon (1833–1913), Icelandic scholar
- Eiríkur Önundarson (born 1974), Icelandic former basketball player
- Eiríkur Örn Norðdahl (born 1978), Icelandic writer
- Eiríkur Rögnvaldsson (born 1955) is an Icelandic linguist
- Eiríkur í Vogsósum (1637–1716), Icelandic priest

== See also ==
- Eiríkr Hákonarson
