= Manuscripts and Special Collections, University of Nottingham Information Services =

Manuscripts and Special Collections, University of Nottingham
- 52.93882419620526°N 1.1711494867973165°W
- Location: Nottingham, England
- Type: academic library

Other information
- Affiliation: University of Nottingham
- Website: www.nottingham.ac.uk/manuscriptsandspecialcollections/index.aspx

Manuscripts and Special Collections is one of the University of Nottingham's Libraries. It is based at King's Meadow Campus in Nottingham in England. The university has been collecting manuscripts since the early 1930s and now holds approximately 3.5 million documents, extensive holdings of Special (Printed Book) Collections, and the East Midlands Collection of local material, all of which are available for researchers and members of the public to use in the supervised Wolfson Reading Rooms.

== Records held ==
Manuscript and archive holdings include the papers of leading Nottinghamshire families and their estates, the records of local businesses and organisations, the personal papers of political, diplomatic, literary, scientific and academic figures, as well as some of the historical records of the university and its predecessor, University College Nottingham.

The most important collections of family and estate papers, with material ranging in date from the 12th to the 20th centuries, include:

- Papers of the Pelham-Clinton family, Dukes of Newcastle-under-Lyne, of Clumber Park, Nottinghamshire
- Papers of the Cavendish family, Dukes of Newcastle upon Tyne and the Cavendish-Bentinck family, Dukes of Portland, of Bolsover Castle and Welbeck Abbey, Nottinghamshire, including the Portland Literary Papers from the library at Welbeck Abbey
- Papers of the Willoughby family, Barons Middleton, of Wollaton Hall, Nottinghamshire and Middleton Hall, Warwickshire
- Papers of the Pierrepont family, Earls Manvers, of Holme Pierrepont Hall and Thoresby Hall, Nottinghamshire
- Papers of the Monckton-Arundell family, Viscounts Galway, of Serlby Hall, Nottinghamshire
- Papers of the Drury-Lowe family of Locko Park, Derbyshire
- Papers of the Denison family of Ossington, Nottinghamshire, including John Evelyn Denison, 1st Viscount Ossington (1800-1873), Speaker of the House of Commons
- Papers of Sir Andrew Buchanan, 1st Baronet (1807-1882), Diplomat
- Papers of the Mellish family of Blyth Hall and Hodsock Priory, Nottinghamshire
- Papers of the Clifton family of Clifton, Nottingham
- Papers of the Eyre family of Grove, Nottinghamshire
- Papers of the Holden family of Nuthall Temple, Nottinghamshire
- Papers of the Parkyns family of Bunny, Nottinghamshire
- Papers and Correspondence of Charles Brinsley Marlay of Westmeath, Ireland and his family, including the Bury family, Earls of Charleville
- Correspondence of the Wrench family of Baslow, Derbyshire
- Correspondence of Mary Howitt (1799–1888), writer

Literary collections include:

- The Wollaton Library Collection, containing 10 medieval manuscripts. Items from the Wollaton Library Collection feature in the web resource Wives, Widows and Wimples
- Papers of and relating to D. H. Lawrence (1885–1930), writer. The collections include original correspondence, artworks and literary papers of D. H. Lawrence, as well as items relating to him, such as research papers, biographical papers, photographs, audio recordings and correspondence of his friends and associates. There is also a Lawrence Special Collection of published works, including first editions, periodical literature and critical literature.
- Papers of Henry Kirke White (1785-1806), poet
- The Cambridge Drama collection of printed works of drama or about the stage. It includes items which had previously belonged to the Cambridge Garrick Club.
- The Cambridge Shakespeare Collection, of editions of Shakespeare's works, and illustrated volumes with engravings and drawings of characters, actors, and scenes from the plays.
- The Woodward Collection, of printed works concerning the Bacon-Shakespeare controversy
- The Coventry Patmore collection, of printed volumes by and about the poet Coventry Patmore (1823-1896)
- The Briggs Collection of pre-1851 educational literature
- The Eiríkur Benedikz Icelandic Collection of printed material relating to Norse, Icelandic and Viking Studies

Records of local businesses and organisations include:

- Records of the Archdeaconry of Nottingham, 1556–1942, including Marriage Bonds, Churchwarden Presentments to the Archdeaconry Court, and cause papers
- Records of non-conformist churches in Nottingham and Mansfield
- Records of lace, hosiery and clothing manufacturers in the East Midlands, and records of Trade Unions relating to the textile industry
- Records of gas and electricity supply companies in the East Midlands
- Farming records from the East Midlands
- Records of river, drainage and water supply bodies in the East Midlands, including records of the Trent River Catchment Board; Trent River Board; Trent River Authority; Trent Fishery Board; Court of Sewers for the Level of Hatfield Chase; and The Hatfield Chase Corporation; Brigg Court of Lincolnshire Commissioners of Sewers; Trent Navigation Company; Records of the City of Nottingham Water Department; and records from Stoke Bardolph Sewage works and Bulcote Model Farm
- Records of Nottingham General Hospital; Nottingham Eye Hospital; Nottingham Children's Hospital; Nottingham Women's Hospital; Highbury Hospital; and Ellerslie House Home
- Records of the Nottingham Medico-Chirurgical Society

The historical records of the University of Nottingham, formerly University College, Nottingham until the Royal Charter granted full University status in August 1948, relate particularly to the development of the university from the 1920s to the 1960s: coverage of the early years following the opening of the college in 1881, and of the last 50 years is less comprehensive. The records include administrative files, accounts, correspondence, minutes, plans, student registers, newspaper cuttings, ephemera, photographs, papers of the Students’ Union and various other student and staff societies, and professional and personal papers of several former members of staff.

== Catalogues and digital resources ==
Catalogue records of the Special Collections are available through the University of Nottingham Library Online Catalogue.

Catalogue records of the manuscript and archive collections are available on the university's own Manuscripts Online Catalogue.

The official website of Manuscripts and Special Collections includes more detailed descriptions of collections and subject areas, online exhibitions, and galleries of digitised materials.

Manuscripts and Special Collections contributed 42 catalogues to the national Access 2 Archives programme, which are now searchable via The National Archives' Discovery Catalogue.

Over 400 collection level descriptions are also available on the Archives Hub

== History ==
The collection of manuscripts and local archives in the University Library was encouraged initially by G.E. Flack, the first College Librarian. References in minutes of the University Council from the 1930s refer to the University Library's accession of significant gifts and deposits of archival materials, a process which accelerated after the war. The first archivist was appointed in 1948, and a separate Department of Manuscripts was established within the University Library in 1958 under the management of a newly appointed Keeper of the Manuscripts.

Subsequent developments have added conservation facilities. With the move into new library premises in 1973 (the Hallward Library) the department acquired purpose-built accommodation and facilities which supported a steady expansion in its holdings and activities.

Early or rare imprints of printed books formed the basis of Special Collections in the areas of arts and social sciences, science and engineering, medicine, agriculture and food sciences, and law. In addition, several of the subject libraries acquired particular named Special Collections, devoted to particular subjects or preserving the libraries of particular individuals and institutions. The East Midlands Collection was developed to serve both as a reference and loan collection for local studies and a special collection of early and rare imprints concerning the region.

In 1989 the Department of Manuscripts became the Department of Manuscripts and Special Collections, with a common reading room and staffing. Since then subject collections from the medical and law libraries have moved into Special Collections. The most substantial internal transfer was the acquisition in 1995 of the library of the former Institute of German, Austrian and Swiss Affairs, including both published and archival holdings.

In 2006 the department moved to new premises at King's Meadow Campus, the university's new campus at Lenton Lane. This provided a reading Room, Store, Conservation, reprographical digitisation workshops and offices, with space for more expansion.

The office has been appointed by the Lord Chancellor as a repository for specified classes of public records (hospital records; British Coal, research report series). It has been approved for the custody of collections of national significance accepted in lieu of tax. It is recognised by the Master of the Rolls as a repository for manorial documents. It is also approved by the Bishop of Southwell and Nottingham as a repository for the archive of the former Archdeaconry of Nottingham.

In October 2005, the Portland (London), Portland of Welbeck, and Newcastle of Clumber papers won recognition through the Designation Scheme of the Museums, Libraries and Archives Council (MLA), as being of outstanding national and international importance. The D. H. Lawrence Collection was similarly recognized in February 2008.

The University of Nottingham announced the decision to sell the campus in 2025 with plans for Manuscripts and Special Collections to remain for several years after the sale.
