= Stokkseyrar-Dísa =

Icelandic witch (1668–1728)

Thordis Markusdottir (Þórdís Markúsdóttir), known as Stokkseyrar-Dísa (1668–1728), was an Icelandic magician (galdrakona). She is known in history for her alleged magical powers. She is the subject of a least ten different folk sagas depicting her experiments within magic or galdr.

Thordis Markusdottir belonged to the elite of the Iceland and was the grandchild of sheriff Torfi Erlendsson of Stafnes and related to Thormodus Torfæus, historian of the King of Denmark. She lived in Stokkseyri, hence the name Stokkseyrar-Dísa. Some of the sagas around her centers on her magical duels with Eiríkur í Vogsósum.
