= List of acts of the Parliament of Great Britain from 1783 =

This is a complete list of acts of the Parliament of Great Britain for the year 1783.

For acts passed until 1707, see the list of acts of the Parliament of England and the list of acts of the Parliament of Scotland. See also the list of acts of the Parliament of Ireland.

For acts passed from 1801 onwards, see the list of acts of the Parliament of the United Kingdom. For acts of the devolved parliaments and assemblies in the United Kingdom, see the list of acts of the Scottish Parliament, the list of acts of the Northern Ireland Assembly, and the list of acts and measures of Senedd Cymru; see also the list of acts of the Parliament of Northern Ireland.

The number shown after each act's title is its chapter number. Acts are cited using this number, preceded by the year(s) of the reign during which the relevant parliamentary session was held; thus the Union with Ireland Act 1800 is cited as "39 & 40 Geo. 3. c. 67", meaning the 67th act passed during the session that started in the 39th year of the reign of George III and which finished in the 40th year of that reign. Note that the modern convention is to use Arabic numerals in citations (thus "41 Geo. 3" rather than "41 Geo. III"). Acts of the last session of the Parliament of Great Britain and the first session of the Parliament of the United Kingdom are both cited as "41 Geo. 3".

Acts passed by the Parliament of Great Britain did not have a short title; however, some of these acts have subsequently been given a short title by acts of the Parliament of the United Kingdom (such as the Short Titles Act 1896).

Before the Acts of Parliament (Commencement) Act 1793 came into force on 8 April 1793, acts passed by the Parliament of Great Britain were deemed to have come into effect on the first day of the session in which they were passed. Because of this, the years given in the list below may in fact be the year before a particular act was passed.

== 23 Geo. 3 ==
The third session of the 15th Parliament of Great Britain, which met from 5 December 1782 until 16 July 1783.

This session was also traditionally cited as 23 G. 3.

=== Public acts ===
Short title	Citation	Royal assent
Long title
Importation Act 1783 (repealed)	23 Geo. 3. c. 1	23 December 1782
An Act to permit the Importation of Wheat, Wheat-Flour, Rye, Rye-Flour, Barley, and all Sorts of Corn, Grain and Meal, upon Payment of the low Duties therein mentioned, for a limited Time. (Repealed by Statute Law Revision Act 1871 (34 & 35 Vict. c. 116))
Supply of Ships to Enemies Act 1783 (repealed)	23 Geo. 3. c. 2	23 December 1782
An Act to continue an Act made in the last Session of Parliament, intituled, "An Act more effectually to prevent His Majesty's Enemies from being supplied with Ships or Vessels from Great Britain." (Note: Supply of Ships to Enemies Act 1782 (22 Geo. 3. c. 71)) (Repealed by Statute Law Revision Act 1871 (34 & 35 Vict. c. 116))
Land Tax Act 1783 (repealed)	23 Geo. 3. c. 3	23 December 1782
An Act for granting an Aid to His Majesty by a Land Tax to be raised in Great Britain, for the Service of the Year One thousand seven hundred and eighty-three. (Repealed by Statute Law Revision Act 1871 (34 & 35 Vict. c. 116))
Malt Duties Act 1783 (repealed)	23 Geo. 3. c. 4	23 December 1782
An Act for continuing and granting to His Majesty certain Duties upon Malt, Mum, Cyder and Perry, for the Service of the Year One thousand seven hundred and eighty-three. (Repealed by Statute Law Revision Act 1871 (34 & 35 Vict. c. 116))
Sir Thomas Rumbold and another Act 1783 (repealed)	23 Geo. 3. c. 5	14 March 1783
An Act for continuing an Act passed in the Twenty-second Year of the Reign of His present Majesty, intituled, "An Act for restraining Sir Thomas Rumbold Baronet, and Peter Perring Esquire, from going out of this Kingdom, for a limited Time; and for discovering their Estates and Effects, and preventing the transporting or alienating the same." (Note: Sir Thomas Rumbold and another Act 1782 (22 Geo. 3. c. 54)) (Repealed by Statute Law Revision Act 1871 (34 & 35 Vict. c. 116))
Continuance of Laws Act 1783 (repealed)	23 Geo. 3. c. 6	14 March 1783
An Act to continue several Laws relating to the regulating the Fees of Officers of the Customs and Naval Officers in America; to the allowing the Exportation of certain Quantities of Wheat, and other Articles, to His Majesty's Sugar Colonies in America; to the permitting the Exportation of Tobacco Pipe Clay from this Kingdom to the British Sugar Colonies or Plantations in the West Indies; and to the repealing the Duties upon Pot and Pearl Ashes, Wood and Weed Ashes imported into Great Britain; and for granting other Duties in lieu thereof. (Repealed by Statute Law Revision Act 1871 (34 & 35 Vict. c. 116))
Marine Mutiny Act 1783 (repealed)	23 Geo. 3. c. 7	14 March 1783
An act for the regulation of his Majesty's marine forces while on shore. (Repealed by Statute Law Revision Act 1871 (34 & 35 Vict. c. 116))
Thames Ballastage Act 1783 (repealed)	23 Geo. 3. c. 8	14 March 1783
An Act for continuing several Acts, passed for the better Regulation of Lastage and Ballastage in the River Thames. (Repealed by Thames Lastage and Ballastage Act 1805 (45 Geo. 3. c. xcviii))
Importation (No. 2) Act 1783 (repealed)	23 Geo. 3. c. 9	14 March 1783
An Act for allowing the Importation of Rice, Paddy, Indian Corn, Indian Meal and Maize, free from Duty, for a limited Time. (Repealed by Statute Law Revision Act 1871 (34 & 35 Vict. c. 116))
Importation (Italian Silk) Act 1783 (repealed)	23 Geo. 3. c. 10	14 March 1783
An Act for further continuing an Act, made in the Nineteenth Year of the Reign of His present Majesty, (Note: Importation of Silk Act 1779 (19 Geo. 3. c. 9)) for allowing the Importation of fine organzined Italian thrown Silk in any Ships or Vessels, for a limited Time. (Repealed by Statute Law Revision Act 1871 (34 & 35 Vict. c. 116))
Customs Act 1783 (repealed)	23 Geo. 3. c. 11	14 March 1783
An Act to amend an Act, made in the Twenty-fourth Year of the Reign of King George the Second, intituled, "An Act for the more effectual securing the Duties upon Tobacco," (Note: Tobacco Duties Act 1750 (24 Geo. 2. c. 41)) to prohibit the Importation of Currants into Great Britain in small Packages; to repeal such Part of the Proviso in an Act of the Eighteenth Year of the Reign of His present Majesty, (Note: Customs (No. 3) Act 1778 (18 Geo. 3. c. 27)) as permits Portugal and Spanish Wines, and other Wines (except French Wines) to be imported in small Casks for private Use; and for taking off the Inland Duty payable upon the Importation of Cocoa Nuts into this Kingdom, upon the Exportation thereof as Merchandize. (Repealed by Statute Law Revision Act 1861 (24 & 25 Vict. c. 101))
Loans or Exchequer Bills Act 1783 (repealed)	23 Geo. 3. c. 12	14 March 1783
An Act for raising a certain Sum of Money by Loans or Exchequer Bills, for the Service of the Year One thousand seven hundred and eighty-three. (Repealed by Statute Law Revision Act 1871 (34 & 35 Vict. c. 116))
Hatfield Chase Act 1783	23 Geo. 3. c. 13	14 March 1783
An Act for more effectually draining and preserving certain Lands and Grounds within the Level of Hatfield Chace, and Parts adjacent, in the Counties of York, Lincoln and Nottingham.
Importation (No. 4) Act 1783 (repealed)	23 Geo. 3. c. 14	21 March 1783
An Act for allowing the Importation of Goods from Europe in Neutral Ships, into the Islands of Saint Christopher, Nevis, Montserrat, Dominica, Saint Vincent, Grenada and the Grenadines; and of Goods, the Produce or Manufacture of the said Islands, and of Tobago and Saint Lucia, from thence into this Kingdom in such Ships, upon Payment of the British Plantation Duties, for a limited Time; for permitting certain Goods, the Produce of those Islands, secured in Warehouses in this Kingdom, to be taken out on Payment of the British Plantation Duties, and to cancel certain Bonds entered into for Payment of the Duties due thereon; for further continuing certain temporary Acts for the Encouragement of Trade, and to repeal an Act made in the Twenty-second Year of His Majesty's Reign; (Note: Importation (No. 2) Act 1782 (22 Geo. 3. c. 30)) for allowing the Importation of Goods the Growth of Saint Christopher, Nevis and Montserrat, into any of His Majesty's Dominions in Europe or America. (Repealed by Statute Law Revision Act 1871 (34 & 35 Vict. c. 116))
Dyeing Trade (Frauds) Act 1783 (repealed)	23 Geo. 3. c. 15	21 March 1783
An Act for rendering more effectual the Provisions contained in an Act of the Thirteenth Year of King George the First, (Note: Dyeing Trade Act 1726 (13 Geo. 1. c. 24)) for preventing Frauds and Abuses in the Dyeing Trade. (Repealed by Statute Law Revision Act 1871 (34 & 35 Vict. c. 116), Statute Law Revision Act 1888 (51 & 52 Vict. c. 3), Master and Servant Act 1889 (52 & 53 Vict. c. 24), Public Authorities Protection Act 1893 (56 & 57 Vict. c. 61) and Statute Law Revision Act 1948 (11 & 12 Geo. 6. c. 62))
Bounty to Garrison of Gibraltar Act 1783 (repealed)	23 Geo. 3. c. 16	21 March 1783
An Act for authorizing the Treasurer of the Navy to pay to the Garrison and Naval Department at Gibraltar, the like Bounty for destroying certain Spanish Ships of War, as is allowed to the Officers and Men on board any of His Majesty's Ships of War, taking or destroying Ships of War belonging to the Enemy. (Repealed by Statute Law Revision Act 1871 (34 & 35 Vict. c. 116))
Mutiny Act 1783 (repealed)	23 Geo. 3. c. 17	21 March 1783
An Act for punishing Mutiny and Desertion, and for the better Payment of the Army and their Quarters. (Repealed by Statute Law Revision Act 1871 (34 & 35 Vict. c. 116))
Payment of Creditors (Scotland) Act 1783 (repealed)	23 Geo. 3. c. 18	21 March 1783
An Act for rendering the Payment of Creditors more equal and expeditious in that Part of Great Britain called Scotland; and for making perpetual so much of an Act made in the Twelfth Year of His present Majesty's Reign, (Note: Bills of Exchange (Scotland) Act 1772 (12 Geo. 3. c. 72)) as relates to Bills and Promissory Notes. (Repealed by Statute Law Revision Act 1871 (34 & 35 Vict. c. 116))
John Whitehill, Esquire Act 1783 (repealed)	23 Geo. 3. c. 19	21 March 1783
An Act for repealing an Act made in the last Session of Parliament, (Note: John Whitehill, Esquire Act 1782 (22 Geo. 3. c. 69)) for compelling John Whitehill Esquire to return into this Kingdom, and for other Purposes, and for vesting in the said John Whitehill his Estate and Effects forfeited in consequence of the said Act, and for restraining him from going out of this Kingdom for a limited Time, and for discovering his Estate and Effects, and preventing the transporting or alienating the same. (Repealed by Statute Law Revision Act 1871 (34 & 35 Vict. c. 116))
Shrewsbury Guildhall Act 1783 (repealed)	23 Geo. 3. c. 20	17 April 1783
An Act for building a new Shire Hall and Guildhall for the County of Salop and the Town of Shrewsbury in the said County; and for the other Purposes therein mentioned. (Repealed by Salop County Council (Shirehall and Guildhall) Act 1915 (5 & 6 Geo. 5. c. xviii))
Bounties Act 1783 (repealed)	23 Geo. 3. c. 21	17 April 1783
An Act for granting a Bounty upon the Exportation of British and Irish Buckrams and Tilletings, British and Irish Linens, British Callicoes and Cottons, or Cotton mixed with Linen printed, painted, stained or dyed in Great Britain. (Repealed by Statute Law Revision Act 1871 (34 & 35 Vict. c. 116))
Papists Act 1783 (repealed)	23 Geo. 3. c. 22	17 April 1783
An Act for allowing further Time for Enrollment of Deeds and Wills made by Papists, and for Relief of Protestant Purchasers. (Repealed by Statute Law Revision Act 1871 (34 & 35 Vict. c. 116))
King's Bench Prison Poor Relief Act 1783 (repealed)	23 Geo. 3. c. 23	17 April 1783
An Act to prevent Prisoners in the King's Bench Prison or the Rules thereof, or their Families or Servants, gaining Settlements in the Parish of Saint George the Martyr in the Borough of Southwark and County of Surrey; and for the Relief of the said Parish with respect to the Families of Prisoners in the said King's Bench or the Marshalsea Prison, or in the County Gaol or House of Correction belonging to the said County; for regulating the Manner of choosing Overseers of the Poor; and for appointing Collectors of the Poor's Rates within the said Parish. (Repealed by London Government (Borough of Southwark) Order in Council 1901 (SR&O 1901/275))
Mutiny (No. 2) Act 1783 (repealed)	23 Geo. 3. c. 24	17 April 1783
An Act for continuing an Act made in this Session of Parliament, intituled, "An Act for punishing Mutiny and Desertion, and for the better Payment of the Army and their Quarters;" (Note: Mutiny Act 1783 (23 Geo. 3. c. 17)) so far as the same relates to the Realm of Great Britain. (Repealed by Statute Law Revision Act 1871 (34 & 35 Vict. c. 116))
Bedford Level Act 1783	23 Geo. 3. c. 25	17 April 1783
An Act to enable the Corporation of the Governor, Bailiffs and Commonalty of the Company of Conservators of the Great Level of the Fens, to sell their Taxes of certain Lands within the Middle and South Levels, Part of the said Great Level, which have been or may be dug for Turf; and to apply the Money arising from such Sale towards discharging the Bond Debts of the said Corporation upon Account of those Levels.
Trade with America Act 1783 (repealed)	23 Geo. 3. c. 26	17 April 1783
An Act to repeal so much of Two Acts made in the Sixteenth (Note: Prohibitory Act 1776 (16 Geo. 3. c. 5)) and Seventeenth (Note: Privateers Act 1776 (17 Geo. 3. c. 7)) Years of the Reign of His present Majesty, as prohibits Trade and Intercourse with the United States of America. (Repealed by Statute Law Revision Act 1871 (34 & 35 Vict. c. 116))
Bridewell Hospital Act 1783	23 Geo. 3. c. 27	17 April 1783
An Act to ascertain and establish the Boundaries of and between the Hospital of Bridewell and the Precinct thereunto belonging, and the Parish of Saint Ann, Blackfriars, in the City of London, as therein specified.
Irish Appeals Act 1783 (repealed)	23 Geo. 3. c. 28	17 April 1783
An Act for removing and preventing all Doubts which have arisen, or might arise, concerning the exclusive Rights of the Parliament and Courts of Ireland in Matters of Legislation and Judicature, and for preventing any Writ of Error or Appeal from any of His Majesty's Courts in that Kingdom from being received, heard and adjudged, in any of His Majesty's Courts in the Kingdom of Great Britain. (Repealed by Northern Ireland Act 1962 (10 & 11 Eliz. 2. c. 30))
Forehoe, Norfolk (Borrowing Powers of Guardians) Act 1783 (repealed)	23 Geo. 3. c. 29	17 April 1783
An Act for rendering effectual an Act made in the Sixteenth Year of the Reign of His present Majesty, (Note: Forehoe Poor Relief Act 1776 (16 Geo. 3. c. 9)) for the better Relief and Employment of the Poor within the Hundred of Forehoe, in the County of Norfolk. (Repealed by Statute Law Revision Act 1948 (11 & 12 Geo. 6. c. 62))
Indemnity Act 1783 (repealed)	23 Geo. 3. c. 30	17 April 1783
An Act to indemnify such Persons as have omitted to qualify themselves for Offices and Employments, and to indemnify Justices of the Peace or others who have omitted to register or deliver in their Qualifications within the Time limited by Law, and for giving further Time for those Purposes; and to indemnify Members and Officers in Cities, Corporations and Borough Towns, whose Admissions have been omitted to be stamped according to Law, or having been stamped have been lost or mislaid; and for allowing them Time to provide Admissions duly stamped; and to give further Time to such Persons as have omitted to make and file Affidavits of the Execution of Indentures of Clerks to Attornies and Solicitors. (Repealed by Promissory Oaths Act 1871 (34 & 35 Vict. c. 48))
Rotherhithe Streets Act 1783 (repealed)	23 Geo. 3. c. 31	17 April 1783
An Act for the better paving, cleansing, lighting and watching the Streets, Lanes, Yards, Courts, Alleys and Passages within the Parish of Saint Mary at Rotherhithe otherwise Redriffe, in the County of Surrey; and for removing and preventing Nuisances and Annoyances therein. (Repealed by London Government (Borough of Bermondsey) Order in Council 1901 (SR&O 1901/264))
Wapping, Stepney Poor Relief, etc. Act 1783 (repealed)	23 Geo. 3. c. 32	17 April 1783
An Act for amending an Act made in the last Session of Parliament (Note: Wapping, Stepney (Poor Relief) Act 1782 (22 Geo. 3. c. 35)) for the better Relief and Employment of the Poor of the Parish of Saint John of Wapping, in the County of Middlesex; and for providing a proper Workhouse and Burial Ground for the Use of the said Parish; and for opening certain Communications and making certain Streets within the said Parish. (Repealed by London Government (Borough of Stepney) Order in Council 1901 (SR&O 1901/276))
Trent and Mersey Canal Act 1783 (repealed)	23 Geo. 3. c. 33	17 April 1783
An Act to amend and render more effectual several Acts passed in the Sixth, (Note: Trent and Mersey Canal Act 1766 (6 Geo. 3. c. 96)) Tenth, (Note: Trent and Mersey Canal Act 1770 (10 Geo. 3. c. 102)) Fifteenth (Note: Trent and Mersey Canal Act 1775 (15 Geo. 3. c. 20)) and Sixteenth (Note: Trent and Mersey Canal Act 1776 (16 Geo. 3. c. 32)) Years of the Reign of His present Majesty for making a Navigable Canal from the Trent, to the Mersey, and a Branch from the said Canal to Froghall, and a Railway from thence to or near Caldon, in the County of Stafford. (Repealed by Trent and Mersey Canal Act 1831 (1 Will. 4. c. lv))
Attainder of David Ogilvy (Disabilities Removed on Pardon) Act 1783 (repealed)	23 Geo. 3. c. 34	17 April 1783
An Act for removing certain Disabilities and Incapacities occasioned by the Attainder of David Ogilvy of Airly Esquire. (Repealed by Statute Law (Repeals) Act 1977 (c. 18))
National Debt Act 1783 (repealed)	23 Geo. 3. c. 35	6 May 1783
An Act for raising a certain Sum of Money by Way of Annuities, and for establishing a Lottery. (Repealed by Statute Law Revision Act 1870 (33 & 34 Vict. c. 69))
East India Company Act 1783 (repealed)	23 Geo. 3. c. 36	6 May 1783
An Act to discharge and indemnify the United Company of Merchants of England, trading to the East Indies, from all Damages, Interest and Losses, in respect to their not making regular Payment of certain Sums due, and to become due to the Public, and to allow further Time for such Payment; and to enable the Company to borrow a certain Sum of Money, and to make a Dividend of Four Pounds per Centum to the Proprietors at Midsummer One thousand seven hundred and eighty-three. (Repealed by Statute Law Revision Act 1872 (35 & 36 Vict. c. 63))
Recruiting Act 1783 (repealed)	23 Geo. 3. c. 37	6 May 1783
An Act to repeal an Act made in the Twentieth Year of the Reign of His present Majesty, (Note: Volunteers Act 1780 (20 Geo. 3. c. 37)) intituled, "An Act to continue for a limited Time so much of an Act made in the last Session of Parliament, (Note: Recruiting Act 1779 (19 Geo. 3. c. 10)) for the more easy and better recruiting His Majesty's Land Forces and Marines, as relates to the Encouragement of Volunteers." (Repealed by Statute Law Revision Act 1871 (34 & 35 Vict. c. 116))
Thames and Severn Canal Act 1783	23 Geo. 3. c. 38	17 April 1783
An Act for making and maintaining a Navigable Canal from the River Thames or Isis at or near Leachlade to join and communicate with the Stroudwater Canal at Wallbridge near the Town of Stroud; and also a Collateral Cut from the said Canal at or near Siddington to or near the Town of Cirencester, in the Counties of Gloucester and Wilts.
Trade with America (No. 2) Act 1783 (repealed)	23 Geo. 3. c. 39	12 May 1783
An Act for preventing certain Instruments from being required from Ships belonging to the United States of America; and to give to His Majesty for a limited Time certain Powers for the better carrying on Trade and Commerce between the Subjects of His Majesty's Dominions and the Inhabitants of the said United States. (Repealed by Statute Law Revision Act 1871 (34 & 35 Vict. c. 116))
Militia Pay Act 1783 (repealed)	23 Geo. 3. c. 40	12 May 1783
An Act for defraying the Charge of the Pay of the Militia, and of the Cloathing for the Serjeants and Drummers of the Militia in that Part of Great Britain called England, for One Year, beginning the Twenty-fifth Day of March One thousand seven hundred and eighty-three. (Repealed by Statute Law Revision Act 1871 (34 & 35 Vict. c. 116))
Trent Navigation Act 1783	23 Geo. 3. c. 41	6 May 1783
An Act for empowering Persons navigating Vessels upon the River Trent, between a Place called Wilden Ferry, in the Counties of Derby and Leicester, or one of them, and the Town of Burton upon Trent, in the County of Stafford, to hale the same with Horses.
Westminster Streets Act 1783 (repealed)	23 Geo. 3. c. 42	6 May 1783
An Act for better paving, cleansing and lighting the Parish of Saint Paul, Covent Garden, within the Liberty of Westminster, and certain Places adjoining thereto; and for removing and preventing Nuisances and Annoyances therein. (Repealed by Parish of St. Paul Covent Garden Act 1829 (10 Geo. 4. c. lxviii) and London Government (City of Westminster) Order in Council 1901 (SR&O 1901/278))
Westminster Streets (No. 2) Act 1783 (repealed)	23 Geo. 3. c. 43	6 May 1783
An Act for better paving, cleansing and lighting the Parish of Saint Anne, and such Part of Cock Lane as lies in the Parish of Saint Martin in the Fields, within the Liberty of Westminster; and for removing and preventing Nuisances and Annoyances therein. (Repealed by London Government (City of Westminster) Order in Council 1901 (SR&O 1901/278))
Clerkenwell Poor Relief Act 1783 (repealed)	23 Geo. 3. c. 44	12 May 1783
An Act for amending and rendering more effectual an Act made in the Fifteenth Year of the Reign of His present Majesty, intituled, "An Act for building a Workhouse, and for the better Relief and Employment of the Poor within the Parish of Saint James, Clerkenwell, in the County of Middlesex." (Note: Clerkenwell (Poor Relief) Act 1775 (15 Geo. 3. c. 23)) (Repealed by London Government (Borough of Hackney) Order in Council 1901 (SR&O 1901/268))
Justiciary and Circuit Courts (Scotland) Act 1783 (repealed)	23 Geo. 3. c. 45	24 June 1783
An Act for regulating the Proceedings of the Court of Justiciary and Circuit Courts in Scotland. (Repealed by Statute Law (Repeals) Act 1981 (c. 19))
City Streets Act 1783	23 Geo. 3. c. 46	24 June 1783
An Act for widening the North West End of Fenchurch Street, and the South End of the Old Jewry, within the City of London.
Leeds and Liverpool Canal Act 1783	23 Geo. 3. c. 47	24 June 1783
An Act for altering and varying the Powers of an Act, passed in the Sixth Year of the Reign of King George the First, (Note: River Douglas Navigation Act 1719 (6 Geo. 1. c. 28)) for making the River Douglas, alias Asland, navigable from the River Ribble to Wigan, in the County Palatine of Lancaster; and for enabling the Company of Proprietors of the Leeds and Liverpool Canal, incorporated by an Act passed in the Tenth Year of His present Majesty's Reign, (Note: Leeds and Liverpool Canal Act 1770 (10 Geo. 3. c. 114)) to purchase the said River Navigation; for amending the said last mentioned Act; for incorporating and consolidating the said Two Navigations; and for other Purposes.
Trent Navigation (No. 2) Act 1783 (repealed)	23 Geo. 3. c. 48	24 June 1783
An Act for improving the Navigation of the River Trent, from a Place called Wilden Ferry, in the Counties of Derby and Leicester, or one of them, to Gainsborough, in the County of Lincoln; and for empowering Persons navigating Vessels thereon to hale the same with Horses. (Repealed by Trent Navigation Act 1858 (21 & 22 Vict. c. xxxiv))
Stamp Duties (No. 1) Act 1783 (repealed)	23 Geo. 3. c. 49	24 June 1783
An Act for repealing an Act, made in the Twenty-second Year of His present Majesty, intituled, "An Act for charging a Stamp Duty upon Inland Bills of Exchange, Promissory Notes, or other Notes payable otherwise than upon Demand;" (Note: Stamp Duties Act 1782 (22 Geo. 3. c. 33)) and for granting new Stamp Duties on Bills of Exchange, Promissory and other Notes, and also Stamp Duties on Receipts. (Repealed by Statute Law Revision Act 1861 (24 & 25 Vict. c. 101))
Paymaster-General Act 1783 (repealed)	23 Geo. 3. c. 50	24 June 1783
An Act for the better Regulation of the Office of the Paymaster General of His Majesty's Forces, and the more regular Payment of the Army; and to repeal an Act, made in the last Session of Parliament, intituled, "An Act for the better Regulation of the Office of Paymaster General of His Majesty's Forces." (Note: Paymaster General Act 1782 (22 Geo. 3. c. 81)) (Repealed by Office of Paymaster General Act 1805 (45 Geo. 3. c. 58))
Egyptians Act 1783 (repealed)	23 Geo. 3. c. 51	24 June 1783
An Act to repeal an Act, made in the Fifth Year of the Reign of Queen Elizabeth, intituled, "An Act for further Punishment of Vagabonds calling themselves Egyptians." (Note: Egyptians Act 1562 (5 Eliz. 1. c. 20)) (Repealed by Statute Law Revision Act 1871 (34 & 35 Vict. c. 116))
Mutiny (No. 3) Act 1783 (repealed)	23 Geo. 3. c. 52	24 June 1783
An Act for punishing Mutiny and Desertion, and for the better Payment of the Army and their Quarters within the Realm of Great Britain. (Repealed by Statute Law Revision Act 1871 (34 & 35 Vict. c. 116))
Failure of Corn Crop (Scotland) Act 1783 (repealed)	23 Geo. 3. c. 53	24 June 1783
An Act to enable the Commissioners of Supply of the several Counties therein mentioned in that Part of Great Britain called Scotland, to assess and levy certain Sums for relieving such of the Inhabitants of the said Counties as have been reduced to Indigence by the Failure of the last Year's Crop of Corn; and to enable His Majesty, during the next Recess of Parliament, by and with the Advice of His Privy Council, to permit the Importation of Corn into the said Counties for a limited Time, and in Ships or Vessels belonging to any State in Amity with His Majesty, navigated by foreign Seamen. (Repealed by Statute Law Revision Act 1871 (34 & 35 Vict. c. 116))
Birmingham Poor Relief Act 1783 (repealed)	23 Geo. 3. c. 54	24 June 1783
An Act for providing a proper Workhouse within the Parish of Birmingham, in the County of Warwick; and for better regulating the Poor within the said Parish. (Repealed by Birmingham Poor Relief Act 1831 (1 & 2 Will. 4. c. lxvii))
Kingston-upon-Hull Improvement Act 1783 (repealed)	23 Geo. 3. c. 55	24 June 1783
An Act for building a new Gaol for the Town and County of the Town of Kingston upon Hull; for purchasing an additional Burial Ground for the Use of the Parish of the Holy Trinity in the said Town; for regulating the Fares of Hackney Coachmen, Chairmen and Porters, and the Prices of Carriage of Goods; for altering the Time of lighting Lamps; for ascertaining the Breadth of Party Walls, and for preventing certain Nuisances within the said Town, Liberties and Precincts thereof; for amending an Act of the Fourteenth Year of the Reign of His present Majesty, (Note: Kingston-upon-Hull Dock Act 1774 (14 Geo. 3. c. 56)) for making and establishing public Quays or Wharfs at Kingston upon Hull, in respect to such as are or may be built opposite to certain Staiths in the said Act described; and for other Purposes. (Repealed by Kingston-upon-Hull Lighting and Cleansing Act 1840 (3 & 4 Vict. c. lxxvi) and Kingston-upon-Hull Improvement Act 1854 (17 & 18 Vict. c. ci))
Customs (No. 2) Act 1783 (repealed)	23 Geo. 3. c. 56	11 July 1783
An Act to allow the Drawback of the whole Duty of Customs upon the Exportation of Rice. (Repealed by Statute Law Revision Act 1861 (24 & 25 Vict. c. 101))
Prize Act 1783 (repealed)	23 Geo. 3. c. 57	11 July 1783
An Act for the Sale of Prize Goods secured in Warehouses in this Kingdom, for which the Duties are not paid, or the Goods exported within a limited Time. (Repealed by Naval Prize Acts Repeal Act 1864 (27 & 28 Vict. c. 23))
Stamp Duties (No. 2) Act 1783 (repealed)	23 Geo. 3. c. 58	11 July 1783
An Act for granting to His Majesty several additional and new Duties upon stamped Vellum, Parchment, and Paper, and also for repealing certain Exemptions from the Stamp Duties. (Repealed by Statute Law Revision Act 1861 (24 & 25 Vict. c. 101))
Sir Thomas Rumbold and another (No. 2) Act 1783 (repealed)	23 Geo. 3. c. 59	11 July 1783
An Act to provide that the Proceedings on the Bill now depending in Parliament, for inflicting certain Pains and Penalties on Sir Thomas Rumbold Baronet and Peter Perring Esquire, for certain Breaches of Public Trust, and High Crimes and Misdemeanours committed by them, whilst they respectively held the Offices of Governor and President, Counsellors and Members of the Select Committee of the Settlement of Fort Saint George, on the Coast of Coromandel, in the East Indies, shall not be discontinued by any Prorogation or Dissolution of Parliament. (Repealed by Statute Law Revision Act 1871 (34 & 35 Vict. c. 116))
Sir Thomas Rumbold and another (No. 3) Act 1783 (repealed)	23 Geo. 3. c. 60	11 July 1783
An Act for further continuing so much of an Act passed in the Twenty-second Year of the Reign of His present Majesty, intituled, "An Act for restraining Sir Thomas Rumbold Baronet and Peter Perring Esquire, from going out of this Kingdom for a limited Time; and for discovering their Estates and Effects, and preventing the transporting or alienating the same," (Note: Sir Thomas Rumbold and another Act 1782 (22 Geo. 3. c. 54)) as relates to restraining the said Sir Thomas Rumbold Baronet and Peter Perring Esquire, from alienating or otherwise disposing of their respective Real Estates. (Repealed by Statute Law Revision Act 1871 (34 & 35 Vict. c. 116))
Lands of Earl of Pembroke Act 1783 (repealed)	23 Geo. 3. c. 61	24 June 1783
An Act for vesting in Henry Earl of Pembroke, his Heirs and Assigns for ever, the Fee Simple and Inheritance of the Hundred of Kynwardston, and certain Lands and Hereditaments in the Parishes of Great Bedwyn and Burbage, in the County of Wilts; and for settling other Lands and Hereditaments in lieu thereof to the same Uses. (Repealed by Statute Law (Repeals) Act 1978 (c. 45))
Stamp Duties (No. 3) Act 1783 (repealed)	23 Geo. 3. c. 62	11 July 1783
An Act for granting to His Majesty a Stamp Duty on Licences to be taken out by certain Persons uttering or vending Medicines, and certain Stamp Duties on all Medicines sold under such Licences, or under the Authority of His Majesty's Letters Patent. (Repealed by Statute Law Revision Act 1861 (24 & 25 Vict. c. 101))
Stage Coach, etc., Duty Act 1783 (repealed)	23 Geo. 3. c. 63	11 July 1783
An Act for granting to His Majesty an additional Duty upon Stage Coaches, and other Carriages therein mentioned. (Repealed by Statute Law Revision Act 1861 (24 & 25 Vict. c. 101))
Malt Duties (No. 2) Act 1783 (repealed)	23 Geo. 3. c. 64	11 July 1783
An Act for taking away from the Commissioners of Excise in England and Scotland the Power of compounding with Persons making Malt, not to sell, but to be consumed in their own private Families. (Repealed by Statute Law Revision Act 1871 (34 & 35 Vict. c. 116))
African Company Act 1783 (repealed)	23 Geo. 3. c. 65	11 July 1783
An Act for repealing an Act made in the Fifth Year of the Reign of His present Majesty, (Note: British Settlements in Africa, etc. Act 1764 (5 Geo. 3. c. 44)) intituled, "An Act for repealing the Act made in the last Session of Parliament, (Note: Fort of Senegal Act 1763 (4 Geo. 3. c. 20)) intituled, 'An Act for vesting the Fort of Senegal, and its Dependencies, in the Company of Merchants trading to Africa;' and to vest as well the said Fort and its Dependencies, as all other the British Forts and Settlements upon the Coast of Africa, lying between the Port of Sallee and Cape Rouge, together with all the Property, Estate, and Effects of the Company of Merchants trading to Africa, in or upon the said Forts, Settlements, and their Dependencies, in His Majesty; and for securing, extending and improving the Trade to Africa; and for vesting James Fort, in the River Gambia, and its Dependencies, and all other the British Forts and Settlements between the Port of Sallee and Cape Rouge, in the Company of Merchants trading to Africa; and for securing and regulating the Trade to Africa." (Repealed by Statute Law Revision Act 1861 (24 & 25 Vict. c. 101))
Duties on Waggons, etc. Act 1783 (repealed)	23 Geo. 3. c. 66	11 July 1783
An Act for granting to His Majesty several Rates and Duties upon Waggons, Wains, Carts, and other such Carriages, not charged with any Duty under the Management of the Commissioners of Excise. (Repealed by Excise (No. 2) Act 1785 (25 Geo. 3. c. 47) and Duties on Wagons, etc. Act 1792 (32 Geo. 3. c. 4))
Stamp Duties Act 1783 (repealed)	23 Geo. 3. c. 67	11 July 1783
An Act for granting to His Majesty a Stamp Duty on the Registry of Burials, Marriages, Births, and Christenings. (Repealed by Stamps (No. 2) Act 1794 (34 Geo. 3. c. 11))
Auditing of the Public Accounts Act 1783 (repealed)	23 Geo. 3. c. 68	11 July 1783
An Act for appointing and enabling Commissioners further to examine, take and state the Public Accounts of the Kingdom. (Repealed by Statute Law Revision Act 1871 (34 & 35 Vict. c. 116))
Postage Act 1783 (repealed)	23 Geo. 3. c. 69	11 July 1783
An Act to enable the Adjutant General of His Majesty's Forces, and the Comptrollers of Army Accounts, to send and receive Letters and Packets free from the Duty of Postage. (Repealed by Post Office (Repeal of Laws) Act 1837 (7 Will. 4 & 1 Vict. c. 32))
Excise Act 1783 (repealed)	23 Geo. 3. c. 70	11 July 1783
An Act for the more effectual preventing the illegal Importation of Foreign Spirits, and for putting a Stop to the private Distillation of British made Spirituous Liquors; for explaining such Part of the Act (Note: Duties on Servants Act 1781 (21 Geo. 3. c. 31)) imposing a Duty upon Male Servants, as relates to the Right of Appeal from the Justices of the Peace; to amend and rectify a Mistake in an Act of the last Session of Parliament, (Note: Taxation Act 1782 (22 Geo. 3. c. 68)) with respect to the Removal of Tea from one Part of this Kingdom to other Parts thereof; and for preventing vexatious Actions against Officers of Excise acting in pursuance of the Authority given by Excise Statutes. (Repealed by Statute Law Revision Act 1871 (34 & 35 Vict. c. 116))
Portsmouth, Chatham Fortifications Act 1783	23 Geo. 3. c. 71	11 July 1783
An Act for making Compensation to the Proprietors of certain Messuages, Lands, Tenements and Hereditaments, in the County of Kent, purchased in pursuance of an Act made in the last Session of Parliament, (Note: Portsmouth, Chatham Fortifications Act 1782 (22 Geo. 3. c. 80)) to vest certain Messuages, Lands, Tenements and Hereditaments in Trustees, for the better securing His Majesty's Docks, Ships and Stores at Portsmouth and Chatham.
Loans or Exchequer Bills (No. 2) Act 1783 (repealed)	23 Geo. 3. c. 72	11 July 1783
An Act for raising a further Sum of Money, by Loans or Exchequer Bills, for the Service of the Year One thousand seven hundred and eighty-three. (Repealed by Statute Law Revision Act 1871 (34 & 35 Vict. c. 116))
Shrewsbury Small Debts Act 1783 (repealed)	23 Geo. 3. c. 73	24 June 1783
An Act for the more easy and speedy Recovery of Small Debts within the Town and Liberties of Shrewsbury, in the County of Salop. (Repealed by County Courts Act 1846 (9 & 10 Vict. c. 95))
Customs (No. 3) Act 1783 (repealed)	23 Geo. 3. c. 74	15 July 1783
An Act for altering the Duties and Drawbacks upon Plain Muslins, unrated Muslins and Callicoes, and Nanquin Cloths. (Repealed by Statute Law Revision Act 1871 (34 & 35 Vict. c. 116))
Duties on Smalts, etc. Act 1783 (repealed)	23 Geo. 3. c. 75	15 July 1783
An Act for repealing so much of an Act made in the Twenty-first Year of the Reign of His present Majesty, (Note: Bounties Act 1781 (21 Geo. 3. c. 40)) as took off the Duties payable upon the Importation of that Species of Blue called Smalts, and for granting Relief to the Owners or Proprietors of Tobacco of the Growth of that Part of Great Britain called Scotland, which shall not be worth the Duties imposed thereon by an Act of the last Session of Parliament. (Note: Tobacco Act 1782 (22 Geo. 3. c. 73)) (Repealed by Statute Law Revision Act 1861 (24 & 25 Vict. c. 101))
Duties on Wines, etc. Act 1783 (repealed)	23 Geo. 3. c. 76	15 July 1783
An Act for the better preventing Frauds in the landing and removing of Wine in this Kingdom; and to prevent the relanding of refined Sugar, entered for Exportation, to obtain the Drawback or Bounty. (Repealed by Statute Law Revision Act 1861 (24 & 25 Vict. c. 101))
Flax, etc., Manufacture Act 1783 (repealed)	23 Geo. 3. c. 77	15 July 1783
An Act for the more effectual Encouragement of the Manufactures of Flax and Cotton in Great Britain. (Repealed by Statute Law Revision Act 1861 (24 & 25 Vict. c. 101))
Appropriation Act 1783 (repealed)	23 Geo. 3. c. 78	16 July 1783
An Act for granting to His Majesty a certain Sum of Money out of the Sinking Fund, and for applying certain Monies therein mentioned, for the Service of the Year One thousand seven hundred and eighty-three, and for further appropriating the Supplies granted in this Session of Parliament. (Repealed by Statute Law Revision Act 1871 (34 & 35 Vict. c. 116))
Coffee and Cocoa-nuts Act 1783 (repealed)	23 Geo. 3. c. 79	15 July 1783
An Act for further encouraging the Growth of Coffee and Cocoa Nuts in His Majesty's Islands and Plantations in America. (Repealed by Statute Law Revision Act 1861 (24 & 25 Vict. c. 101))
American Loyalists Act 1783 (repealed)	23 Geo. 3. c. 80	15 July 1783
An Act for appointing Commissioners to enquire into the Losses and Services of all such Persons who have suffered in their Rights, Properties, and Professions during the late unhappy Dissentions in America, in Consequence of their Loyalty to His Majesty, and Attachment to the British Government. (Repealed by Statute Law Revision Act 1871 (34 & 35 Vict. c. 116))
Exportation Act 1783 (repealed)	23 Geo. 3. c. 81	15 July 1783
An Act for preventing the Exportation of Corn, Grain, or Meal with a Bounty, during the Operation of Two Acts passed in this present Session of Parliament, for allowing the Importation of Corn. (Repealed by Statute Law Revision Act 1871 (34 & 35 Vict. c. 116))
Receipt of the Exchequer Act 1783 (repealed)	23 Geo. 3. c. 82	11 July 1783
An Act for establishing certain Regulations in the Receipt of His Majesty's Exchequer. (Repealed by Statute Law Revision Act 1861 (24 & 25 Vict. c. 101))
East India Company (No. 2) Act 1783 (repealed)	23 Geo. 3. c. 83	15 July 1783
An Act for granting Relief to the United Company of Merchants of England, trading to the East Indies, by allowing further Time for the Payment of certain Sums due and to become due to the Public, and by advancing to the said Company on the Terms therein mentioned, a certain Sum of Money to be raised by Loans or Exchequer Bills, and to enable the said Company to make a Dividend of Four Pounds per Centum to the Proprietors at Christmas One thousand seven hundred and eighty-three, and to regulate the future Payment of Debentures of Drawbacks on East India Goods. (Repealed by Statute Law Revision Act 1861 (24 & 25 Vict. c. 101))
Loans or Exchequer Bills (No. 3) Act 1783 (repealed)	23 Geo. 3. c. 84	15 July 1783
An Act to enable His Majesty to raise a further Sum of Money by Loans or Exchequer Bills, to pay off and discharge the Debts due and owing on the Civil List. (Repealed by Statute Law Revision Act 1871 (34 & 35 Vict. c. 116))
Annuity to Sir George Augustus Elliott Act 1783 (repealed)	23 Geo. 3. c. 85	16 July 1783
An Act for settling and securing a certain Annuity for the Use of the Right Honourable Sir George Augustus Eliott Knight of the Most Honourable Order of the Bath, in Consideration of the eminent Services performed by him to His Majesty and this Country. (Repealed by Statute Law Revision Act 1871 (34 & 35 Vict. c. 116))
Annuity to Lord Rodney Act 1783 (repealed)	23 Geo. 3. c. 86	16 July 1783
An Act for settling and securing a certain Annuity on George Lord Rodney, and the Two next Persons to whom the Barony of Rodney shall descend, in Consideration of the eminent Services performed by the said George Lord Rodney to His Majesty and the Public. (Repealed by Statute Law Revision Act 1871 (34 & 35 Vict. c. 116))
Portsmouth, Faversham Fortifications Act 1783	23 Geo. 3. c. 87	11 July 1783
An Act for vesting certain Messuages, Lands, Tenements and Hereditaments in Trustees, for the further securing His Majesty's Docks, Ships and Stores at Portsmouth; and for the more safe and convenient carrying on of His Majesty's Gunpowder Works and Mills near the Town of Faversham.
Rogues and Vagabonds Act 1783 (repealed)	23 Geo. 3. c. 88	24 June 1783
An Act to extend the Provisions of an Act, intituled, "An Act to amend and make more effectual the Laws relating to Rogues, Vagabonds and other idle and disorderly Persons, and to Houses of Correction," (Note: Justices Commitment Act 1743 (17 Geo. 2. c. 5)) to certain Cases not therein mentioned. (Repealed by Statute Law Revision Act 1861 (24 & 25 Vict. c. 101))
Westminster Streets (No. 3) Act 1783 (repealed)	23 Geo. 3. c. 89	24 June 1783
An Act for better paving, cleansing and lighting the Parish of Saint Clement Danes, in the County of Middlesex, and certain Places adjoining thereto; and for removing and preventing Nuisances and Annoyances therein. (Repealed by London Government (City of Westminster) Order in Council 1901 (SR&O 1901/278))
Westminster Streets (No. 4) Act 1783 (repealed)	23 Geo. 3. c. 90	24 June 1783
An Act for better paving, cleansing, and lighting the Parish of Saint Martin in the Fields, within the Liberty of Westminster, and certain Places adjoining thereto; and for removing and preventing Nuisances and Annoyances therein. (Repealed by London Government (City of Westminster) Order in Council 1901 (SR&O 1901/278))
Whitechapel Streets Act 1783 (repealed)	23 Geo. 3. c. 91	11 July 1783
An Act for paving and regulating Church Lane, in and near the Parishes of Saint Mary, Whitechapel, and Saint George, in the County of Middlesex, and several other Streets, Avenues and Places within the same Parish of Saint Mary, Whitechapel, and preventing Annoyances therein; and for enabling the Inhabitants of the said Parish of Saint Mary, Whitechapel, to raise Money to defray the Expences incurred in repairing the Parish Church. (Repealed by Whitechapel Improvement Act 1853 (16 & 17 Vict. c. cxli))
Birmingham and Fazeley Canal Act 1783 or the Birmingham Canal Navigation Act 1783 (repealed)	23 Geo. 3. c. 92	24 June 1783
An Act for making and maintaining a Navigable Canal from a Place near Rider's Green, in the County of Stafford, to Broadwater Fire Engine, and Six Collateral Cuts from the same to several Coal Mines; and also a Navigable Canal from or near the Town of Birmingham, to join the Coventry Canal at or near Fazeley, in the Parish of Tamworth, in the said County of Stafford, with a Collateral Cut to the lower Part of the said Town of Birmingham. (Repealed by Birmingham Canal Navigations Act 1818 (58 Geo. 3. c. xix) and Birmingham Canal Navigations Act 1835 (5 & 6 Will. 4. c. xxxiv))
Bushey Heath to Aylesbury Road Act 1783 (repealed)	23 Geo. 3. c. 93	14 March 1783
An Act to enlarge the Term and Powers of an Act, passed in the Second Year of the Reign of His present Majesty, (Note: Hertford and Bucks Roads Act 1762 (2 Geo. 3. c. 63)) for amending, widening, altering and keeping in Repair the Road from the South End of Sparrows Herne on Bushey Heath, through the Market Towns of Watford, Berkhampsted, Saint Peter's and Tring, in the County of Hertford, by Pettipher's Elms, to the Turnpike Road at Walton, near Aylesbury, in the County of Bucks. (Repealed by Sparrows Herne (Hertfordshire) and Walton (Buckinghamshire) Road Act 1823 (4 Geo. 4. c. lxiv))
Leeds and Halifax Roads Act 1783 (repealed)	23 Geo. 3. c. 94	14 March 1783
An Act for continuing the Term, and altering and enlarging the Powers of several Acts of Parliament therein mentioned, so far as the same relate to the repairing and amending of the Roads leading from Leeds through Bradford and Horton, and through Bowling and Wibsey to Halifax; and also the Roads called Bowling Lane and Little Horton Lane, in the West Riding of the County of York. (Repealed by Leeds and Halifax Turnpike Roads and Branches Act 1825 (6 Geo. 4. c. cxlix))
Yorkshire Roads Act 1783 (repealed)	23 Geo. 3. c. 95	14 March 1783
An Act to enlarge the Term and Powers of Two Acts, made in the Fourteenth (Note: Doncaster and Tadcaster Road Act 1740 (14 Geo. 2. c. 28)) and Twenty-sixth (Note: Ferrybridge and Boroughbridge Road Act 1753 (26 Geo. 2. c. 77)) Years of the Reign of King George the Second, for repairing the Roads from Doncaster through Ferrybridge to the South Side of Tadcaster Cross; and also from Ferry-bridge to Wetherby, and from thence to Borough-bridge, in the County of York, so far as the same relate to the Road between Ferry-bridge and Wetherby, and from thence to Borough-bridge. (Repealed by Ferrybridge and Boroughbridge Road Act 1842 (5 & 6 Vict. c. lxxxvi))
Somerset Roads Act 1783 (repealed)	23 Geo. 3. c. 96	14 March 1783
An Act for enlarging the Term and Powers of an Act, passed in the First Year of the Reign of His present Majesty, intituled, "An Act for repairing and widening the Roads from Dyed Way to Somerton, and from Gawbridge to Tintinhull Fords, and from a Stream of Water called Ford to Cartgate in Martock, in the County of Somerset." (Note: Somerset Roads Act 1760 (1 Geo. 3. c. 29)) (Repealed by Somerton District of Roads (Somerset) Act 1823 (4 Geo. 4. c. lxii))
Canterbury to Whitstable Road Act 1783 (repealed)	23 Geo. 3. c. 97	14 March 1783
An Act for continuing and amending Two Acts of the Ninth and Twenty-seventh Years of His late Majesty, for repairing and widening the Road leading from Saint Dunstan's Cross, near the City of Canterbury, to the Water Side at Whitstable, in the County of Kent. (Repealed by Road from Canterbury to Whitstable Act 1804 (44 Geo. 3. c. i))
Worcester Roads Act 1783 (repealed)	23 Geo. 3. c. 98	14 March 1783
An Act for continuing the Term, and altering and enlarging the Powers of an Act of the Second Year of His present Majesty, (Note: Salop and Worcester Roads Act 1762 (2 Geo. 3. c. 79)) for amending, widening and keeping in Repair several Roads leading from Cleobury Mortimer, The Cross Houses, Glazeley and the Turnpike Gate on Abberley Hill, in the Counties of Salop and Worcester. (Repealed by Roads from Bridgnorth to Cleobury Mortimer Act 1825 (6 Geo. 4. c. xlix))
Stafford and Chester Roads Act 1783 (repealed)	23 Geo. 3. c. 99	17 April 1783
An Act to enlarge the Term and Powers of an Act made in the Second Year of His present Majesty's Reign (Note: Stafford and Chester Roads Act 1762 (2 Geo. 3. c. 42)) for repairing, widening and altering the Road from Sandon, in the County of Stafford, to Bullock Smithy, in the County of Chester; and from Hilderstone to Draycott in the Moors; and from Wetley Rocks to Tean, in the said County of Stafford. (Repealed by Sandon Roads (Cheshire and Staffordshire) Act 1824 (5 Geo. 4. c. xxiv))
Berkshire Roads Act 1783 (repealed)	23 Geo. 3. c. 100	21 March 1783
An Act for continuing the Term and altering and enlarging the Powers of an Act of the Third Year of His present Majesty, (Note: Maidenhead, Reading, etc. Roads Act 1763 (3 Geo. 3. c. 46)) for repairing the Roads from Maidenhead Bridge to Reading, and from the said Bridge to Henley Bridge, (Note: Henley Bridge in Henley-on-Thames. 51°32′15″N 0°54′01″W) in the County of Berks. (Repealed by Roads from Maidenhead Bridge to Reading and to Henley Bridge Act 1806 (46 Geo. 3. c. cxlv) and Maidenhead, Reading and Henley Road Act 1826 (7 Geo. 4. c. lxx))
Chester and Stafford Roads Act 1783 (repealed)	23 Geo. 3. c. 101	21 March 1783
An Act for continuing and enlarging the Term and Powers of an Act made in the Third Year of the Reign of His present Majesty, (Note: Lawton, Burslem and Newcastle-under-Lyme Road Act 1763 (3 Geo. 3. c. 45)) for repairing and widening the Road from Lawton, in the County of Chester, to Burslem and Newcastle-under-Lyme, in the County of Stafford, and other Roads therein mentioned. (Repealed by Lawton, Burslem and Newcastle-under-Lyme Turnpike Roads Act 1859 (22 & 23 Vict. c. lxxxvii))
London City Road Act 1783 (repealed)	23 Geo. 3. c. 102	17 April 1783
An Act for enlarging the Term and Powers of an Act made in the First Year of the Reign of His present Majesty, intituled, "An Act for making, widening and repairing a Road from the North East Side of the Goswell Street Road next Islington, in the County of Middlesex, and near to the Road called the New Road over the Fields and Grounds to Old Street Road opposite to the Doghouse Bar; and at and from the Doghouse Bar to the End of Chiswell Street, by the Artillery Ground." (Note: London, City Road Act 1760 (1 Geo. 3. c. 26)) (Repealed by City Road Act 1824 (5 Geo. 4. c. lxi))
Wetherby to Knaresborough Road Act 1783 (repealed)	23 Geo. 3. c. 103	17 April 1783
An Act for repairing and widening the Roads leading from Wetherby to Knaresborough, in the County of York. (Repealed by Wetherby and Knaresborough Road Act 1824 (5 Geo. 4. c. viii))
Gloucester Roads Act 1783 (repealed)	23 Geo. 3. c. 104	17 April 1783
An Act for amending and widening the Road from the Passage or Ferry over the River Severn at Newnham in the County of Gloucester, through the Parishes of Newnham and Little Dean, to a Place called Saint White's, adjoining His Majesty's Forest of Dean, in the said County. (Repealed by Road from Newnham to St. Whites (Gloucestershire) Act 1805 (45 Geo. 3. c. cix) and Statute Law (Repeals) Act 2013 (c. 2))
Stafford and Salop Roads Act 1783 (repealed)	23 Geo. 3. c. 105	14 March 1783
An Act for continuing and amending an Act of the Third Year of His present Majesty, (Note: Stafford, Sandon and Eccleshall Road Act 1763 (3 Geo. 3. c. 59)) for repairing and widening the Road leading from the Town of Stafford to Sandon, in the County of Stafford, and several other Roads in the Counties of Salop and Stafford. (Repealed by Road from Ranton and Ellenhall to the Whitchurch Turnpike near Newport (Salop.) Act 1804 (44 Geo. 3. c. xxv), Roads from Stafford and from Bridgeford Act 1824 (5 Geo. 4. c. lviii) and Bridgnorth (Salop.) and Shiffnall Road Act 1825 (6 Geo. 4. c. viii))
Gloucestershire Roads Act 1783 (repealed)	23 Geo. 3. c. 106	6 May 1783
An Act for completing and keeping in Repair the Road from the Ram Inn, in the Town of Cirencester, in the County of Gloucester, through the Town of Tetbury to Oldfield, otherwise Woefield Corner, near the Sixteenth Mile Stone in the Bath Road, and a Road from thence through the Parishes of Cold Ashton and Swanswick, to or near Lambridge, in the Parish of Bath Easton, near the City of Bath, and for continuing the present Road from the said Corner, to or near the Monument upon Lansdown, until the intended Road from the said Corner to or near Lambridge be made fit for travelling. (Repealed by Cirencester Road Act 1812 (52 Geo. 3. c. xxvii), Annual Turnpike Acts Continuance Act 1873 (36 & 37 Vict. c. 90) and Statute Law (Repeals) Act 2013 (c. 2))
Leicester Roads Act 1783 (repealed)	23 Geo. 3. c. 107	6 May 1783
An Act to revive and render more effectual an Act passed in the Thirtieth Year of the Reign of His late Majesty King George the Second, (Note: Leicestershire Roads Act 1757 (30 Geo. 2. c. 49)) for repairing the Road from Markfield Turnpike, in the County of Leicester, over Charley, otherwise Charnwood Forest, through the Town of Whitwick, and from thence through Talbot Lane, to where the Road leading from the Town of Loughborough, to the Town of Ashby de la Zouch, in the said County, comes in from Ryley Lane near to a Place called Snape Gate. (Repealed by Markfield Turnpike and Snape Gate Road Act 1826 (7 Geo. 4. c. cxxxiv))
Cumberland and Westmorland Roads Act 1783 (repealed)	23 Geo. 3. c. 108	6 May 1783
An Act for enlarging the Term and Powers of an Act made in the Second Year of the Reign of His present Majesty King George the Third, intituled, "An Act for widening, repairing and amending the Road from Hesket by Yewes Bridge to Cockermouth, and from thence by Lorton over Whinlatter to Keswick, in the County of Cumberland; and from Keswick by Dummail Rays and Ambleside, to Kirby in Kendall, in the County of Westmoreland; and from Plumbgarth's Cross near Kirby in Kendall aforesaid, to the Lake called Windermere, in the County of Westmoreland, and from Keswick aforesaid, to the Town of Penrith, in the County of Cumberland." (Note: Cumberland and Westmorland Roads Act 1762 (2 Geo. 3. c. 81)) (Repealed by Penrith and Cockermouth Road Act 1824 (5 Geo. 4. c. iv) and Keswick and Plumbgarth's Cross and Windermere Roads Act 1824 (5 Geo. 4. c. xiv))
Southampton Roads Act 1783 (repealed)	23 Geo. 3. c. 109	24 June 1783
An Act for enlarging the Term and Powers of an Act passed in the Second Year of His present Majesty's Reign, (Note: Dorset, etc., Roads Act 1762 (2 Geo. 3. c. 61)) for altering, widening, and amending the Road from the North Gate of the City of Winchester, over Worthy Cow Down, through Whitchurch and other Places, to Newtown River, and also the Road from Worthy Cow Down aforesaid, through Wherwell, to the present Turnpike Road at Andover, in the County of Southampton. (Repealed by Roads from Winchester and from Worthy Cow Down Act 1823 (4 Geo. 4. c. lxxxiii))
Marylebone Road Act 1783 (repealed)	23 Geo. 3. c. 110	24 June 1783
An Act for enlarging the Terms and Powers of Two Acts made in the Seventh Year of King George the First, (Note: Marylebone Road Act 1720 (7 Geo. 1. St. 1. c. 26)) and the Eighth Year of King George the Second, (Note: Marylebone Road Act 1734 (8 Geo. 2. c. 8)) for repairing the Road from Saint Giles's Pound (Note: St Giles's Pound, at the corner of Oxford Street and Tottenham Court Road.) to Kilbourne Bridge, (Note: Kilburn Bridge was located where the Edgware Road (Kilburn High Road) crossed the River Westbourne. The river is now culverted. 51°32′08″N 0°11′25″W) and for paving Oxford Road; and also of an Act made in the Twenty-ninth Year of King George the Second, (Note: Highgate and Hampstead Roads Act 1756 (29 Geo. 2. c. 88)) to enable the respective Trustees of the Turnpike Roads leading to Highgate Gate House and Hampstead, and from Saint Giles's Pound to Kilbourne, to make a new Road from the Great Northern Road at Islington, to the Edgeware Road near Paddington, so far as the same is by the said Act directed to be under the Management of the Trustees of the said Two first mentioned Acts. (Repealed by Road to Kilburn Bridge, and Road from Islington to the Edgware Road Act 1813 (53 Geo. 3. c. clxv) and Metropolis Roads Act 1826 (7 Geo. 4. c. cxlii))
Wiltshire Roads Act 1783 (repealed)	23 Geo. 3. c. 111	11 July 1783
An Act for continuing the Term, and altering and enlarging the Powers of Two Acts, made in the Second (Note: Wiltshire Highway Act 1728 (2 Geo. 2. c. 12)) and Twenty-fifth (Note: Wiltshire Roads Act 1751 (25 Geo. 2. c. 5)) Years of the Reign of His late Majesty, for repairing the Highways between Sheppard's Shord and Horsley Upright Gate, leading down Bagdown Hill, in the County of Wilts, and other ruinous Parts of the Highways thereunto adjacent. (Repealed by Wiltshire Roads (No. 2) Act 1790 (30 Geo. 3. c. 98))

=== Private acts ===
Short title	Citation	Royal assent
Long title
Turvey Inclosure Act 1783	23 Geo. 3. c. 1 Pr.	14 March 1783
An Act for dividing, allotting and enclosing the Open and Common Fields, Common Meadows, Common Pastures, Waste and other Commonable Lands and Grounds in the Parish of Turvey, in the County of Bedford.
Barnard Castle Inclosure Act 1783	23 Geo. 3. c. 2 Pr.	14 March 1783
An Act for dividing and enclosing the Open Fields within the Township of Barnard Castle, in the County of Durham.
Dunnington Heath Inclosure Act 1783	23 Geo. 3. c. 3 Pr.	14 March 1783
An Act for enclosing Dunnington Heath, within the Manor of Priors Salford, in the County of Warwick.
North Deighton Inclosure Act 1783	23 Geo. 3. c. 4 Pr.	14 March 1783
An Act for dividing and enclosing several Open Fields, and a Parcel of Meadow Ground, within the Township of North Deighton, in the County of York.
Heytesbury Inclosure Act 1783	23 Geo. 3. c. 5 Pr.	14 March 1783
An Act for dividing and allotting in severalty the Open and Common Fields and Downs, Common Meadows, Common Pastures and Commonable Places within the Parish of Heytesbury, in the County of Wilts.
Ruete's Naturalization Act 1783	23 Geo. 3. c. 6 Pr.	14 March 1783
An Act for naturalizing John Daniel Frederick Ruete.
Fasnacht's Naturalization Act 1783	23 Geo. 3. c. 7 Pr.	14 March 1783
An Act for naturalizing David Emanuel Fasnacht.
Seehl's Naturalization Act 1783	23 Geo. 3. c. 8 Pr.	14 March 1783
An Act for naturalizing Ephraim Rinhold Seehl.
Renaud's, &c. Naturalization Act 1783	23 Geo. 3. c. 9 Pr.	14 March 1783
An Act for naturalizing Stephen Gideon Renaud and John Francis Daniel Renaud.
Newcastle-under-Lyme Inclosure and Poor Rates Amendment Act 1783 (repealed)	23 Geo. 3. c. 10 Pr.	21 March 1783
An Act to amend an Act passed in the Twenty-second Year of His present Majesty's Reign, intituled, "An Act for enclosing and leasing a Piece of Waste Land called The Marsh, within the Parish and Borough of Newcastle-under-Lyme, in the County of Stafford, and applying the Profits thereof in Aid of the Poor's Rates of the said Parish and Borough." (Note: Newcastle-under-Lyme Inclosure and Poor Rates Act 1782 (22 Geo. 3. c. 29 Pr.)) (Repealed by Staffordshire Act 1983 (c. xviii))
Piffard's Naturalization Act 1783	23 Geo. 3. c. 11 Pr.	21 March 1783
An Act for naturalizing David Piffard.
Lord Ongley's Estate Act 1783	23 Geo. 3. c. 12 Pr.	17 April 1783
An Act for vesting the Manor or reputed Manor of Vintners, otherwise Vinters, the Mansion House, and certain Lands and Hereditaments in the County of Kent, being Part of the Settled Estates of the Right Honourable Robert Lord Ongley of the Kingdom of Ireland, in Trustees to be sold; and for laying out the Monies arising by such Sale, in the Purchase of other Messuages, Lands and Hereditaments to be settled in lieu thereof to the like Uses.
Pitt's Grant of Lands at Petersham Act 1783	23 Geo. 3. c. 13 Pr.	17 April 1783
An Act to enable His Majesty to grant the Inheritance of several Pieces or Parcels of Land in or near the Parish of Petersham, formerly Part of the Park there, called Richmond Park or New Park, in the County of Surrey to Thomas Pitt Esquire and his Heirs, for a full and valuable Consideration.
Pulteney's Estate Act 1783	23 Geo. 3. c. 14 Pr.	17 April 1783
An Act for enabling William Pulteney Esquire to grant Leases of certain Estates in the County of Middlesex and City of London.
Stanford Inclosure Act 1783	23 Geo. 3. c. 15 Pr.	17 April 1783
An Act for dividing, allotting and enclosing the Open Fields, Meadows, Pastures, Commons and Commonable Lands within the Manor and Township of Stanford, in the County of Berks.
Henshaw, &c. Inclosure Act 1783	23 Geo. 3. c. 16 Pr.	17 April 1783
An Act for dividing, allotting and enclosing the several Town Fields, Commons, Moors and Waste Grounds and Stinted Land within the Manors of Henshaw and Melkeridge in the Parish of Haltwhistle in the County of Northumberland.
Roos Inclosure Act 1783 (repealed)	23 Geo. 3. c. 17 Pr.	17 April 1783
An Act for dividing and enclosing certain Open Common Fields, Meadows, Pastures and other Commonable Lands and Grounds in Rooss in Holderness, in the East Riding of the County of York. (Repealed by Holderness Drainage Act 1802 (42 Geo. 3. c. l))
Burton Hastings Inclosure Act 1783	23 Geo. 3. c. 18 Pr.	17 April 1783
An Act for dividing, allotting, and enclosing the Open Fields, Meadows, Pastures, Commons and Commonable Places, in the Parish of Burton Hastings, in the County of Warwick.
Staunton-upon-Wye Inclosure Act 1783	23 Geo. 3. c. 19 Pr.	17 April 1783
An Act for dividing, enclosing and improving a certain Common or Waste Ground, within the Parish of Staunton upon Wye, in the County of Hereford; and for extinguishing the Right of Common upon certain enclosed Lands within the said Parish.
Williams' Divorce Act 1783	23 Geo. 3. c. 20 Pr.	17 April 1783
An Act to dissolve the Marriage of John Williams of the City of Exeter, Gentleman, with Elizabeth his now Wife, and to enable him to marry again; and for other Purposes therein mentioned.
Harding's Name Act 1783	23 Geo. 3. c. 21 Pr.	17 April 1783
An Act to enable Richard Newman Harding Esquire, and his first and other Sons, and the Heirs Male of their Bodies, to take, use, and bear the Surname and Arms of Newman, pursuant to the Will of Richard Newman Esquire deceased.
Hankey's Divorce Act 1783	23 Geo. 3. c. 22 Pr.	17 April 1783
An Act to dissolve the Marriage of John Hankey Esquire, with Elizabeth Thomson his now Wife, and to enable him to marry again; and for other Purposes therein mentioned.
Reybaz's, &c. Naturalization Act 1783	23 Geo. 3. c. 23 Pr.	17 April 1783
An Act for naturalizing John Urban Reybaz and Alexander Aubert.
Tourneisen's Naturalization Act 1783	23 Geo. 3. c. 24 Pr.	17 April 1783
An Act for naturalizing John James Tourneisen.
Church Lench Inclosure Act 1783	23 Geo. 3. c. 25 Pr.	6 May 1783
An Act for dividing and enclosing the Open and Common Fields, and other Commonable Lands, within the Parish of Church Lench, in the County of Worcester.
Browne's Name Act 1783	23 Geo. 3. c. 26 Pr.	6 May 1783
An Act to enable John Browne Esquire, and his Issue Male to take and use the Surname of Selby, pursuant to the Will of William Selby Esquire deceased.
Ruther's Naturalization Act 1783	23 Geo. 3. c. 27 Pr.	6 May 1783
An Act for naturalizing Christian Hinrich Ruther.
Gresley's Estate Act 1783	23 Geo. 3. c. 28 Pr.	12 May 1783
An Act for empowering Nigel Bowyer Gresley Esquire to lease Part of his settled Estates in Staffordshire, pursuant to an Agreement entered into with George Parker and others, Ironmasters; and also to grant Leases of Lands and Mines within the same Estates.
Duke of Norfolk's Estate Act 1783	23 Geo. 3. c. 29 Pr.	24 June 1783
An Act to enable Charles Duke of Norfolk and others, to grant Building or Repairing Leases of certain Tenements, Houses and Grounds, in the Parish of Saint Clement Danes, in the County of Middlesex, and in or near the Town of Arundel, in the County of Sussex.
Doctors Commons, &c. Estate Act 1783	23 Geo. 3. c. 30 Pr.	24 June 1783
An Act for carrying into Execution an Agreement between the Dean and Chapter of Saint Paul's, London, and the College of Doctors of Law, exercent in the Ecclesiastical and Admiralty Courts, for vesting certain Tenements in the City of London, called Doctors Commons, held by the said College under the said Dean and Chapter by Leases for Years in the said College in Fee Simple, and reserving thereout a certain yearly Rent to the said Dean and Chapter, and their Successors for ever.
Abdy's Estate Act 1783	23 Geo. 3. c. 31 Pr.	24 June 1783
An Act to enable Sir William Abdy Baronet, to grant Leases of his Estate at Horsey Down, in the County of Surrey.
Templer's Estate Act 1783	23 Geo. 3. c. 32 Pr.	24 June 1783
An Act for vesting such Parts of the Real Estates of James Templer Esquire deceased, as lie in the Counties of Hants, Wilts, and Dorset, in Trustees, to be sold, and for laying out the Money arising by such Sale, in the Purchase of other Lands, to be settled to the Uses, and for the Purposes therein mentioned.
Luther's Estate Act 1783	23 Geo. 3. c. 33 Pr.	24 June 1783
An Act for vesting Part of the settled Estates of John Luther Esquire, in the County of Southampton, in the said John Luther in Fee Simple, and for settling an Estate of greater Value in lieu thereof.
Williams's Estate Act 1783	23 Geo. 3. c. 34 Pr.	24 June 1783
An Act to vest in Trustees and their Heirs, certain Estates of John Hanbury Williams Esquire, situate in the County of Monmouth, in order to be sold, and the Purchase Money applied upon the Trusts, and for the Purposes in the said Act mentioned.
Kingsomborn Inclosure Act 1783	23 Geo. 3. c. 35 Pr.	24 June 1783
An Act for dividing and enclosing the Open and Common Fields in the Manor and Parish of Kingsomborn, in the County of Southampton.
Odstock, &c. Inclosure Act 1783	23 Geo. 3. c. 36 Pr.	24 June 1783
An Act for dividing and allotting the Open Common Fields, Common Meadows, Open Common Downs, Waste Lands, and Commonable Places, within the several Parishes of Odstock, Homington, West Harnham, and Netherhampton, and certain Open Lands lying at the East End of the said Parish of Homington, in the County of Wilts.
Boilstone Inclosure Act 1783	23 Geo. 3. c. 37 Pr.	24 June 1783
An Act for dividing and enclosing several Open Common Fields, Common Meadows, Common Pastures, Commons, and Waste Grounds, within the Manor and Parish of Boilstone, in the County of Derby.
Chatteris Inclosure and Improvement Act 1783 (repealed)	23 Geo. 3. c. 38 Pr.	24 June 1783
An Act for the better ordering and regulating the Manner of feeding, using, cultivating, and enjoying several Commonable and Waste Grounds lying in Chatteris, in the Isle of Ely, in the County of Cambridge; and for obliging the Occupiers of certain Parts of the said Grounds to fence the same. (Repealed by Chatteris Inclosure Act 1793 (33 Geo. 3. c. 12 Pr.))
Johnby Inclosure Act 1783	23 Geo. 3. c. 39 Pr.	24 June 1783
An Act to establish an Agreement for extinguishing the Right of Common upon certain Waste Grounds, and for enfranchising certain customary Estates within the Manor of Johnby, in the County of Cumberland.
Bayntun's Divorce Act 1783	23 Geo. 3. c. 40 Pr.	24 June 1783
An Act to dissolve the Marriage of Andrew Bayntun Esquire with Lady Maria Coventry his now Wife, and to enable him to marry again; and for other Purposes therein mentioned.
Miol's Naturalization Act 1783	23 Geo. 3. c. 41 Pr.	24 June 1783
An Act for naturalizing Isaac Lewis Miol.
Wale's, &c. Naturalization Act 1783	23 Geo. 3. c. 42 Pr.	24 June 1783
An Act for naturalizing Margaretta Philipina Wale and Mary Pemberton.
Hanwell Inclosure Act 1783	23 Geo. 3. c. 43 Pr.	11 July 1783
An Act for confirming, establishing and making effectual the Enclosure of the Open and Common Fields, Commonable Lands, Cow Pasture, Heath and Waste Grounds, within the Manor and Parish of Hanwell, in the County of Oxford.
Power's Estate Act 1783	23 Geo. 3. c. 44 Pr.	11 July 1783
An Act to effectuate a Partition or Division of certain Messuages, Lands and Hereditaments, in the County of Wilts, heretofore the Estates of Jonathan Power Esquire, deceased.

=== Sources ===
- Pickering, Danby, ed. (1782). "Anno vicesimo tertio Georgii III". The Statutes at Large. Vol. 34. Cambridge. pp. 203–404 – via Google Books.
- Journals of the House of Commons. Vol. 39. London: His Majesty's Stationery Office. 1803. pp. 3–707 – via Google Books.
- Chronological Table of and Index to the Statutes. Vol. 1: To the End of the Session 59 Vict. Sess. 2 (1895) (13th ed.). London: Her Majesty's Stationery Office. 1896. pp. 140–142 – via Google Books.

== 24 Geo. 3. Sess. 1 ==
The fourth session of the 15th Parliament of Great Britain, which met from 11 November 1783 until 24 March 1784.

This session was also traditionally cited as 24 Geo. 3. sess. 1, 24 Geo. 3. Stat. 1, 24 Geo. 3. stat. 1, 24 Geo. 3. St. 1, 24 Geo. 3. st. 1, 24 G. 3. sess. 1, 24 G. 3. Sess. 1, 24 G. 3. Stat. 1, 24 G. 3. stat. 1, 24 G. 3. St. 1 or 24 G. 3. st. 1.

=== Public acts ===
Short title	Citation	Royal assent
Long title
Malt Duties (No. 3) Act 1783 (repealed)	24 Geo. 3. Sess. 1. c. 1	24 December 1783
An Act for continuing and granting to His Majesty certain Duties upon Malt, Mum, Cyder, and Perry, for the Service of the Year One thousand seven hundred and eighty-four. (Repealed by Statute Law Revision Act 1871 (34 & 35 Vict. c. 116))
Trade with America (No. 3) Act 1783 (repealed)	24 Geo. 3. Sess. 1. c. 2	24 December 1783
An Act to continue, for a limited Time, an Act made in the last Session of Parliament, intituled, "An Act for preventing certain Instruments from being required from Ships belonging to the United States of America; and to give to His Majesty, for a limited Time, certain Powers for the better carrying on Trade and Commerce between the Subjects of His Majesty's Dominions and the Inhabitants of the said United States." (Note: Trade with America (No. 2) Act 1783 (23 Geo. 3. c. 39)) (Repealed by Statute Law Revision Act 1871 (34 & 35 Vict. c. 116))
East India Company (No. 3) Act 1783 (repealed)	24 Geo. 3. Sess. 1. c. 3	24 December 1783
An Act to continue so much of an Act made in the last Session of Parliament, as allows further Time for the Payment of certain Sums due and to become due to the Public from the United Company of Merchants of England trading to the East Indies. (Repealed by Statute Law Revision Act 1871 (34 & 35 Vict. c. 116))
Land Tax (No. 2) Act 1783 (repealed)	24 Geo. 3. Sess. 1. c. 4	24 December 1783
An Act for granting an Aid to His Majesty by a Land Tax to be raised in Great Britain for the Service of the Year One thousand seven hundred and eighty-four. (Repealed by Statute Law Revision Act 1871 (34 & 35 Vict. c. 116))
Borrowstouness Canal Act 1783	24 Geo. 3. Sess. 1. c. 5	24 December 1783
An Act to enable the Company of Proprietors of the Borrowstounness Navigable Cut or Canal, more effectually to complete and maintain the same.
Postage (No. 2) Act 1783 (repealed)	24 Geo. 3. Sess. 1. c. 6	11 March 1784
An Act for establishing certain Regulations concerning the Portage and Conveyance of Letters and Packets by the Post, between Great Britain and Ireland. (Repealed by Post Office (Repeal of Laws) Act 1837 (7 Will. 4 & 1 Vict. c. 32))
Bills of Exchange, etc. Act 1783 (repealed)	24 Geo. 3. Sess. 1. c. 7	11 March 1784
An Act to explain and amend an Act made in the last Session of Parliament, (Note: Stamp Duties (No. 1) Act 1783 (23 Geo. 3. c. 49)) intituled, "An Act for repealing an Act made in the Twenty-second Year of His present Majesty, (Note: Stamp Duties Act 1782 (22 Geo. 3. c. 33)) intituled, 'An Act for charging a Stamp Duty upon Inland Bills of Exchange, Promissory Notes, or other Notes, payable otherwise than upon Demand,' and for granting new Stamp Duties on Bills of Exchange, Promissory and other Notes, and also Stamp Duties on Receipts;" and for indemnifying all Persons who have written or signed any Bill of Exchange, Promissory or other Note, or any Receipt not stamped according to Law. (Repealed by Statute Law Revision Act 1861 (24 & 25 Vict. c. 101))
Kent (Small Debts) Act 1783 (repealed)	24 Geo. 3. Sess. 1. c. 8	11 March 1784
An Act for the more easy and speedy Recovery of Small Debts, within the Town and Port of Dover, and the Parishes of Charlton, Buckland, River, Ewell, Lydden, Coldred, East Langdon, West Langdon, Ringwould, Saint Margaret's-at-Cliff, Whitfield, otherwise Beausfield, Guston, Hougham, otherwise Huffham, Caple le Fern, and Alkham, and also the Liberty of Dover Castle, in the County of Kent. (Repealed by County Courts Act 1846 (9 & 10 Vict. c. 95))
Norfolk (Drainage) Act 1783 (repealed)	24 Geo. 3. Sess. 1. c. 9	11 March 1784
An Act to enlarge the Powers of an Act, made in the Thirtieth Year of the Reign of His late Majesty King George the Second, intituled, "An Act for draining and preserving certain Marsh and Fen Lands, and Low Grounds, in the Parish of Wiggenhall Saint Mary Magdalen, in the County of Norfolk." (Note: Wiggenhall Drainage Act 1757 (30 Geo. 2. c. 32)) (Repealed by Wiggenhall St. Mary Magdalen Drainage Act 1833 (3 & 4 Will. 4. c. xcvi))
Land Tax (No. 3) Act 1783 (repealed)	24 Geo. 3. Sess. 1. c. 10	24 March 1784
An Act for appointing Commissioners to put in Execution an Act of this Session of Parliament, intituled, "An Act for granting an Aid to His Majesty by a Land Tax, to be raised in Great Britain, for the Service of the Year One thousand seven hundred and eighty-four;" (Note: Land Tax (No. 2) Act 1783 (24 Geo. 3. Sess. 1. c. 4)) together with those named in two former Acts for appointing Commissioners of the Land Tax, and with those named in an Act of the last Session of Parliament, intituled, "An Act for granting an Aid to His Majesty by a Land Tax, to be raised in Great Britain for the Service of the Year One thousand seven hundred and eighty-three." (Note: Land Tax Act 1783 (23 Geo. 3. c. 3)) (Repealed by Statute Law Revision Act 1871 (34 & 35 Vict. c. 116))
Mutiny (No. 4) Act 1783 (repealed)	24 Geo. 3. Sess. 1. c. 11	24 March 1784
An Act for punishing Mutiny and Desertion, and for the better Payment of the Army and their Quarters. (Repealed by Statute Law Revision Act 1871 (34 & 35 Vict. c. 116))
Removal of Prisoners, etc. Act 1783 (repealed)	24 Geo. 3. Sess. 1. c. 12	24 March 1784
An Act to authorize the Removal of Prisoners in certain Cases, and to amend the Laws respecting the Transportation of Offenders. (Repealed by Statute Law Revision Act 1861 (24 & 25 Vict. c. 101))
Militia Pay, etc. Act 1783 (repealed)	24 Geo. 3. Sess. 1. c. 13	24 March 1784
An Act for defraying the Charge of the Militia in that Part of Great Britain called England, for One Year, beginning the Twenty-fifth Day of March, One thousand seven hundred and eighty-four, and for lessening the Number of Deputy Lieutenants and Justices of the Peace to act in the Execution of the Laws relating to the Militia. (Repealed by Statute Law Revision Act 1861 (24 & 25 Vict. c. 101))
Exportation Act 1783 (repealed)	24 Geo. 3. Sess. 1. c. 14	24 March 1784
An Act to continue the Provisions of an Act of the Twenty-third of His present Majesty, (Note: Bounties Act 1783 (23 Geo. 3. c. 21)) for granting a Bounty upon the Exportation of British and Irish Buckrams and Tilletings, British and Irish Linens, British Calicoes and Cottons or Cotton mixed with Linen, printed, painted, stained, or dyed, in Great Britain, for a limited Time. (Repealed by Statute Law Revision Act 1871 (34 & 35 Vict. c. 116))
Trade with America (No. 4) Act 1783 (repealed)	24 Geo. 3. Sess. 1. c. 15	24 March 1784
An Act for further continuing, for a limited Time, an Act made in the last Session of Parliament, intituled, "An Act for preventing certain Instruments from being required from Ships belonging to the United States of America, and to give to His Majesty, for a limited Time, certain Powers for the better carrying on Trade and Commerce between the Subjects of His Majesty's Dominions and the Inhabitants of the said United States." (Note: Trade with America (No. 2) Act 1783 (23 Geo. 3. c. 39)) (Repealed by Statute Law Revision Act 1871 (34 & 35 Vict. c. 116))
Papists (No. 2) Act 1783 (repealed)	24 Geo. 3. Sess. 1. c. 16	24 March 1784
An Act for allowing further Time for Enrolment of Deeds and Wills made by Papists, and for Relief of Protestant Purchasers. (Repealed by Statute Law Revision Act 1871 (34 & 35 Vict. c. 116))
Marine Mutiny (No. 2) Act 1783 (repealed)	24 Geo. 3. Sess. 1. c. 17	24 March 1784
An Act for the Regulation of His Majesty's Marine Forces while on Shore. (Repealed by Statute Law Revision Act 1871 (34 & 35 Vict. c. 116))
Edinburgh Roads Act 1783 (repealed)	24 Geo. 3. Sess. 1. c. 18	24 March 1784
An Act for regulating and rendering more effectual the Exaction of the Statute Work, within the Shire of Edinburgh, and for authorizing the Trustees for putting in Execution several Acts, for repairing the High Roads in the County of Edinburgh, to borrow upon the Credit of the Tolls arising within the District of Laswade, a further Sum of Money to be applied for Payment of certain Sums borrowed, on the Personal Security of the said Trustees; and for further repairing the Roads within the said District. (Repealed by Edinburgh Turnpike Roads Act 1835 (5 & 6 Will. 4. c. lxii) and Edinburgh Highways and Bridges Act 1835 (5 & 6 Will. 4. c. lxviii))
Isle of Wight (Carriage Rates) Act 1783 (repealed)	24 Geo. 3. Sess. 1. c. 19	24 March 1784
An Act for settling the Rates for the Carriage of Passengers and Goods for Hire to and from the Isle of Wight. (Repealed by Statute Law (Repeals) Act 1978 (c. 45))
Bradford-on-Avon (Additional Overseer) Act 1783 (repealed)	24 Geo. 3. Sess. 1. c. 20	24 March 1784
An Act for the Appointment of an additional Overseer, for the better Government of the Poor of the Parish of Bradford, in the County of Wilts. (Repealed by Statute Law Revision Act 1948 (11 & 12 Geo. 6. c. 62))
Newhaven Bridge Act 1783	24 Geo. 3. Sess. 1. c. 21	24 March 1784
An Act for building a Bridge over the River Ouse at Newhaven, in the County of Sussex.
Shillingford Oxford (Roads and Bridge) Act 1783 (repealed)	24 Geo. 3. Sess. 1. c. 22	24 December 1783
An Act for enlarging the Term and Powers of an Act passed in the Fourth Year of the Reign of His present Majesty, (Note: Shillingford Roads and Bridge Act 1764 (4 Geo. 3. c. 42)) for repairing and widening the Road from Shillingford, in the County of Oxford, through Wallingford and Pangborne to Reading, in the County of Berks, and for building a Bridge over the River Thames at or near Shillingford Ferry. (Repealed by Shillingford and Reading Road Act 1827 (7 & 8 Geo. 4. c. xix))
Kirby Kendal to Kirkby Ireleth Road Act 1783 (repealed)	24 Geo. 3. Sess. 1. c. 23	24 December 1783
An Act to continue and enlarge the Term and Powers of an Act, made in the Third Year of the Reign of His present Majesty, intituled, "An Act for repairing, widening, and keeping in Repair the Road from Kirkby Kendall, in the County of Westmorland, to Kirkby Ireleth, in the County of Lancaster." (Note: Kirby Kendal and Kirby Ireleth Road Act 1763 (3 Geo. 3. c. 33)) (Repealed by Road from Kirkby Kendall to Kirkby Ireleth Act 1820 (1 Geo. 4. c. xviii) and Annual Turnpike Acts Continuance Act 1872 (35 & 36 Vict. c. 85))
Nottinghamshire and Derby Roads Act 1783 (repealed)	24 Geo. 3. Sess. 1. c. 24	11 March 1784
An Act for enlarging the Term and Powers of an Act, made in the Fourth Year of the Reign of His present Majesty, (Note: Nottinghamshire and Derby Roads Act 1764 (4 Geo. 3. c. 83)) for repairing and widening the Road from Bramcote Odd House in the County of Nottingham, to the Cross Post upon Smalley Common, in the County of Derby, and from Ilkeston to the Towns of Heanor and Shipley, in the said County of Derby, and from Trowell in the County of Nottingham, to the Town of Nottingham, except so far as relates to the Road leading from Ilkeston to the Town of Shipley. (Repealed by Roads from Smalley Common and from Ilkeston (Derbyshire, Nottinghamshire) Act 1825 (6 Geo. 4. c. xv))
Hertford Roads Act 1783 (repealed)	24 Geo. 3. Sess. 1. c. 25	11 March 1784
An Act for enlarging the Term and Powers of an Act, of the Third Year of the Reign of His present Majesty, (Note: Herts Roads Act 1763 (3 Geo. 3. c. 26)) for repairing the Roads from Lemnsford Mill through Welwyn and Stevenage, and by Cory's Mill to Hitchin, and from Welwyn through Codicot to Hitchin in the County of Hertford. (Repealed by Bishop's Hatfield and Hitchin, and Welwyn and Hitchin Roads Act 1831 (1 Will. 4. c. xxxvi))
Devon Roads Act 1783 (repealed)	24 Geo. 3. Sess. 1. c. 26	11 March 1784
An Act for enlarging the Term and Powers of an Act, passed in the Fifth Year of the Reign of His present Majesty, (Note: Devon Roads Act 1765 (5 Geo. 3. c. 69)) for repairing and widening the Roads from the South End of Newton Abbott to the Passage Way in Kingswear, opposite Clifton Dartmouth Hardness, and from the End of a Lane leading cut of the Turnpike Road between Newton Abbott and Totnes, towards Abbott's Kerswell to Five Lanes, and from Langver's Barn to the said Turnpike Road, between Newton Abbott and Totnes, and from Galmpton Warborough to Monk's Bridge and Brixham Quay, and from Langver's Barn to the North End of Paington Town, all in the County of Devon. (Repealed by Newton Abbott and Torquay Roads Act 1823 (4 Geo. 4. c. xvii))
Cornwall Roads Act 1783 (repealed)	24 Geo. 3. Sess. 1. c. 27	11 March 1784
An Act to enlarge the Term and Powers of an Act, made in the Second Year of the Reign of His present Majesty, (Note: Cornwall Roads Act 1762 (2 Geo. 3. c. 46)) for repairing and widening the Road from the Lostwithiel Turnpike Road, in the Parish of Creed, in the County of Cornwall, through Tregony to Ruan Lanehorne, and from Dennis Water to Three Hundred Yards on the South Side of Trethim Mill, in the Parish of Saint Just in the said County. (Repealed by Road from Creed to Ruan Lanehorne (Cornwall) Act 1827 (7 & 8 Geo. 4. c. lxxiii))
Northamptonshire Roads Act 1783 (repealed)	24 Geo. 3. Sess. 1. c. 28	11 March 1784
An Act for enlarging the Term and Powers of an Act, passed in the Second Year of the Reign of His present Majesty, (Note: Leicestershire Roads Act 1762 (2 Geo. 3. c. 54)) for amending, widening, and keeping in Repair, the Road from Castle Street at the End of the Town of Hinckley to Lutterworth Town's End, and from or near the Guide Post at Walcot Town's End in the County of Leicester, to the Eighty Mile Stone in Welford Field, in the County of Northampton. (Repealed by Road from Hinckley to Lutterworth Act 1805 (45 Geo. 3. c. xxxvi) and Road from Hinckley to Lutterworth Act 1823 (4 Geo. 4. c. lx))
Boroughbridge, Catterick and Piersebridge Road Act 1783 (repealed)	24 Geo. 3. Sess. 1. c. 29	11 March 1784
An Act for continuing the Term and Powers of Two Acts, made in the Sixteenth (Note: Boroughbridge, Catterick and Piersebridge Road Act 1742 (16 Geo. 2. c. 7)) and Twenty-second (Note: Boroughbridge, Catterick and Piersebridge Road Act 1748 (22 Geo. 2. c. 39)) Years of the Reign of His late Majesty, King George the Second, for repairing the high Road from Boroughbridge, in the County of York, to Catherick, in the same County, and from thence to Pier's Bridge, on the River Tees. (Repealed by Boroughbridge, Catterick and Piersbridge Road Act 1825 (6 Geo. 4. c. ix))
Wiltshire Roads (No. 2) Act 1783 (repealed)	24 Geo. 3. Sess. 1. c. 30	11 March 1784
An Act for enlarging the Term and Powers of an Act, passed in the Second Year of His present Majesty's Reign, intituled, "An Act for amending and widening the Road from the Turnpike Road at or near the Town of Swindon, to the North End or Side of the Town of Marlborough, and from the said Town of Marlborough to the Village of Everley, in the County of Wilts." (Note: Wilts Roads Act 1762 (2 Geo. 3. c. 49)) (Repealed by Road from the Swindon Turnpike to Everley Act 1805 (45 Geo. 3. c. xxxvii), Swindon and Marlborough Road Act 1826 (7 Geo. 4. c. cxxxvii) and Marlborough District of Roads Act 1832 (2 & 3 Will. 4. c. xcvii))
Barnstaple Roads Act 1783 (repealed)	24 Geo. 3. Sess. 1. c. 31	24 March 1784
An Act for continuing the Term, and altering and enlarging the Powers of an Act, of the Third Year of the Reign of His present Majesty, (Note: Barnstaple Roads Act 1763 (3 Geo. 3. c. 35)) for repairing, widening, and keeping in Repair, several Roads leading from the Town of Barnstaple, in the County of Devon. (Repealed by Barnstaple Roads Act 1827 (7 & 8 Geo. 4. c. xiv))
Cosham to Chichester Road Act 1783 (repealed)	24 Geo. 3. Sess. 1. c. 32	24 March 1784
An Act to continue and enlarge the Term and Powers of an Act, made in the Second Year of His present Majesty, intituled, "An Act for repairing and widening the Road from Cosham, in the County of Southampton, to the City of Chichester." (Note: Cosham to Chichester Road Act 1762 (2 Geo. 3. c. 84)) (Repealed by Road from Cosham to Chichester Act 1806 (46 Geo. 3. c. xlvi))
Carmarthen Roads Act 1783	24 Geo. 3. Sess. 1. c. 33	24 March 1784
An Act for continuing the Term and Powers of an Act, made in the Third Year of the Reign of His present Majesty, (Note: Carmarthen and Pembroke Roads Act 1763 (3 Geo. 3. c. 34)) for repairing the Road from the Fourteen Mile Stone in the Parish of Mothvey, to Tavern Spite, in the County of Carmarthen, and for repairing, amending, and keeping in Repair, several other Roads within the said County. (Repealed by Carmarthen Roads Act 1803 (43 Geo. 3. c. xxx), Carmarthen Roads Act 1812 (52 Geo. 3. c. cli) and Main Trust Roads (Carmarthen) Act 1828 (9 Geo. 4. c. lxxvi))
Lincoln Roads Act 1783 (repealed)	24 Geo. 3. Sess. 1. c. 34	24 March 1784
An Act for continuing and amending an Act, of the Fourth Year of His present Majesty, (Note: Lincoln Road Act 1764 (4 Geo. 3. c. 80)) for repairing and widening the Roads from Spalding High Bridge to the Market Place in Donington, and from the Tenth Mile Stone in the Parish of Gosbertown to the Eighth Mile Stone in the Parish of Wigtoft, in the County of Lincoln. (Repealed by Roads from Spalding High Bridge to Donington Act 1826 (7 Geo. 4. c. lxxxv))

=== Private acts ===
Short title	Citation	Royal assent
Long title
Splitgerber's &c. Naturalization Act 1783	24 Geo. 3. Sess. 1. c. 1 Pr.	24 December 1783
An Act for naturalizing John Christian Splitgerber and Sebastian Fridag.
Touray's Naturalization Act 1783	24 Geo. 3. Sess. 1. c. 2 Pr.	24 December 1783
An Act for naturalizing Michael Peter Touray.
Morley Inclosure Act 1783	24 Geo. 3. Sess. 1. c. 3 Pr.	11 March 1784
An Act for dividing and enclosing several Commons and Waste Grounds within the Parish of Morley, in the County of Derby.
Lumley's Name Act 1783	24 Geo. 3. Sess. 1. c. 4 Pr.	11 March 1784
An Act to enable the Honourable Richard Lumley and his Heirs Male, to take and use the Surname and Arms of Savile, pursuant to the Will of Sir George Savile Baronet, deceased.
Nisbet's Divorce Act 1783	24 Geo. 3. Sess. 1. c. 5 Pr.	11 March 1784
An Act to dissolve the Marriage of Walter Nisbet Esquire, with Anne Blomberg his now Wife, and to enable him to marry again, and for other Purposes therein mentioned.
Brande's Naturalization Act 1783	24 Geo. 3. Sess. 1. c. 6 Pr.	11 March 1784
An Act for naturalizing Augustus Everard Brande.
Eicke's &c. Naturalization Act 1783	24 Geo. 3. Sess. 1. c. 7 Pr.	11 March 1784
An Act for naturalizing Detlev-Bonaventura Eicke, and John Henry Hecker.
Grant to Baroness of Greenwich Act 1783	24 Geo. 3. Sess. 1. c. 8 Pr. (Note: This act was given royal assent using the form of words for a public act.)	24 March 1784
An Act to enable His Majesty to grant the Inheritance of a certain Piece or Parcel of Land, in or near the Parish of Petersham, formerly Part of the Park there, called Richmond Park or New Park, in the County of Surrey, to Caroline Baroness of Greenwich and her Heirs, for a full and valuable Consideration.
Duke of Bolton's Estate Act 1783	24 Geo. 3. Sess. 1. c. 9 Pr.	24 March 1784
An Act for vesting Part of the Estates of Charles late Duke of Bolton, deceased, devised and settled by his Will in Trustees, discharged of the Uses and Limitations limited, created, and expressed in the said Will, for the Purpose of more effectually carrying into Execution a Decree and certain Orders of the High Court of Chancery for Sale of the same Estate, and for other Purposes therein mentioned.
Bishop of Norwich's Estate Act 1783	24 Geo. 3. Sess. 1. c. 10 Pr.	24 March 1784
An Act for establishing and confirming an Agreement, made, between the Lord Bishop of Norwich and Jacob Preston Esquire, for the Exchange of certain Estates in the County of Norfolk.
Grubbe's Estate Act 1783	24 Geo. 3. Sess. 1. c. 11 Pr.	24 March 1784
An Act to enable William Hunt Grubbe Esquire, and Walter Hunt Grubbe Gentleman, and after their several Deaths the Guardians of their respective Issue, to make Leases of their settled Estates in the County of Wilts and City of Bristol.
Leyburn Inclosure Act 1783	24 Geo. 3. Sess. 1. c. 12 Pr.	24 March 1784
An Act for dividing and enclosing a certain Moor or Common within the Manor of Leyburn and Parish of Wensley, in the North Riding of the County of York.
Andovor Inclosure Act 1783	24 Geo. 3. Sess. 1. c. 13 Pr.	24 March 1784
An Act for dividing and enclosing the Common Fields, Common Downs, Common Woods, Waste Lands, and other Commonable Places in the Parish of Andovor, in the County of Southampton.
Lewes's Name Act 1783	24 Geo. 3. Sess. 1. c. 14 Pr.	24 March 1784
An Act to enable David Edward Lewes Esquire to take, use, and bear the Surname and Arms of Lloyd, pursuant to the Will of Richard Lloyd, late of Werne Newith, in the County of Cardigan, Esquire, deceased.

=== Sources ===
- Pickering, Danby, ed. (1782). "Anno vicesimo quarto Georgii III". The Statutes of the Realm. Vol. 34. Cambridge. pp. 407–756 – via Google Books.
- Journals of the House of Commons. Vol. 39. London: His Majesty's Stationery Office. 1803. pp. 709–1050 – via Google Books.
- Chronological Table of and Index to the Statutes. Vol. 1: To the End of the Session 59 Vict. Sess. 2 (1895) (13th ed.). London: Her Majesty's Stationery Office. 1896. p. 142 – via Google Books.

== See also ==
- List of acts of the Parliament of Great Britain
