= Stamp Duties Act 1783 =

Act of the Parliament of Great Britain

- Act of Parliament
- Parliament of Great Britain
- Long title: An Act for granting to His Majesty a Stamp Duty on the Registry of Burials, Marriages, Births, and Christenings.
- Citation: 23 Geo. 3. c. 67
- Territorial extent: Great Britain

Dates
- Royal assent: 7 July 1783
- Commencement: 1 October 1783 (Note: Section 1.)
- Repealed: 1 August 1794
Other legislation
Repealed by	Stamps Act 1794

Status: Repealed

Text of statute as originally enacted

The Stamp Duties Act 1783 (23 Geo. 3. c. 67) was an act of the Parliament of Great Britain in order to raise money to pay for the American War of Independence. Under the provisions of this act, all baptism, marriage and burial entries in each parish register were subject to a tax of 3d (old pence). Church ministers were empowered to collect the duty, and were allowed to keep 10% of this fee as compensation for their trouble. Refusal to pay carried a fine of £5.

This was a deeply unpopular tax, and many clergymen were sympathetic to the plight of their parishioners, and as paupers were exempt from this tax, it is not uncommon for family history researchers and genealogists to find that the number of supposed poor people within a parish has increased many times above normal during these years until the act was finally repealed in 1794. Such entries in a parish register are annotated with either the letter "P." or "Pauper". If a family could not claim exemption then it was not unusual for them simply not to bother, and this would result in a number of adult "late" baptisms during the following decades.

== Subsequent developments ==
The whole act was repealed by section 1 of the Stamps Act 1794 (34 Geo. 3. c. 11), which came into force on 1 August 1794.

== Bibliography ==
- "Old Parish Registers". General Register Office of Scotland. 28 June 2006. Archived from the original on 4 July 2006.
