= Eiríkur Rögnvaldsson =

Eiríkur Rögnvaldsson (born 1 June 1955 in Sauðárkrókur, Iceland) is an Icelandic linguist and professor of Icelandic at the University of Iceland. He is the author of several prominent works on the Icelandic language, including Íslensk hljóðkerfisfræði (“Icelandic phonology”, 1993), Íslensk rímorðabók (“Icelandic rhyme dictionary”, 1989), and several textbooks for university and high school students. He is also a prominent Icelandic scholar in the field of natural language processing, having among other things co-authored the Icelandic Parsed Historical Corpus.
