= Eiríkur í Vogsósum =

Icelandic priest and magician (c.1637–1716)

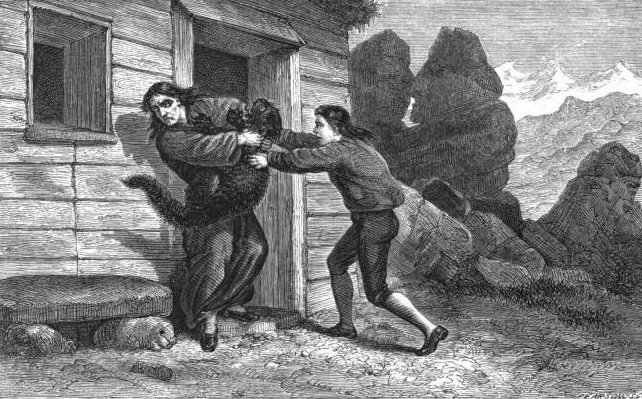
An engraving showing a cat springing at a vicar's neck as denoted in an Icelandic legend.

Séra Eiríkur Magnússon í Vogsósum (c.1637(?)/1638–1716), was an Icelandic priest and galdramaður. While he was a real person, he has been the subject of many folk tales because of his interest in and study in witchcraft. He is known in Icelandic folklore, where there are many folktales about his alleged magical abilities. He owned the farm Vogsósar, and was the vicar of Selvog church in the parish of Selvogur from 1677–1716. Some tales with him as the hero center on his magical duels with Stokkseyrar-Dísa. As a child he attended the Cathedral School at Skálholt to about 1658 and was ordained in 1668 by Bishop Brynjólfur Sveinsson as curate of Arnarboeli. He became the parish priest of Vogsósar in 1667.

== Folklore and variations ==
One folktale recounts how Eírikur rescued a woman who had been kidnapped by trolls. He is also said to have exorcised the ghost of a woman named Guðrún (also known by the diminutive, Gunna). In life she had owed a man named Vilhjálmur a debt but could not pay it as she was too poor. In consequence he took her cooking pot as payment. After she died Guðrún became a draugr and soon Vilhjálmur is also found dead. Eírikur exorcises the ghost by means of a slip of paper and a ball of wool with two knots in it which he gives to two men seeking his help. Guðrún unties the knots and runs after the ball until she falls into a hot spring.

Another story, which Jacqueline Simpson calls "How Eírikur Learned His Arts At School," takes place when Eírikur is at school in Skálholt. He and two of his friends, Bogi and Magnús, plan to learn magic. One night they journey to the cathedral graveyard and raise the ghost of an old man, obtaining the fragments of his magic book, and later compile the grimoire Gráskinna, making use of the many spells in the fragment. Years later he is summoned to Biskupstungar, where the Bishop of Skálholt shows him Gráskinna and asks him whether he knows any of the signs in it. He answers that he does not know a single one of the signs but later admits he knew all but one of them. In folklore, Eírikur is a kind, generous and compassionate man who only uses his powers for good.
