= Eiríkur Benedikz =

Icelandic scholar, diplomat and book collector

Eiríkur Benedikz (1907–1988) was an Icelandic scholar, diplomat and book collector. He left his library of around 3000 items of Icelandica to the University of Nottingham library, where it is housed among the Manuscripts and Special Collections

== Works ==
- An anthology of Icelandic poetry, 1969.
