= Trent Navigation Company =

British river navigation company between 1783–1940

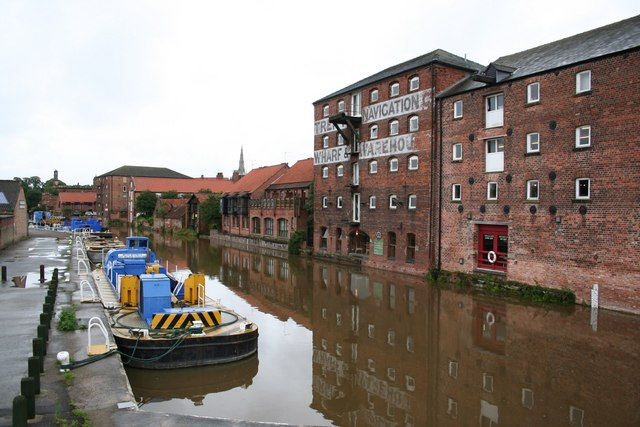
Trent Navigation Warehouse at Newark-on-Trent

The Trent Navigation Company existed from 1783 to 1940. It was responsible for control of navigation on the River Trent in England.

== History ==
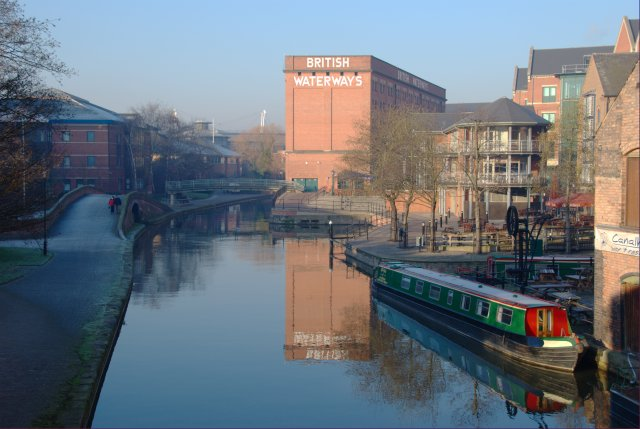
British Waterways building (formerly the Trent Navigation Company warehouse) on the Nottingham Canal

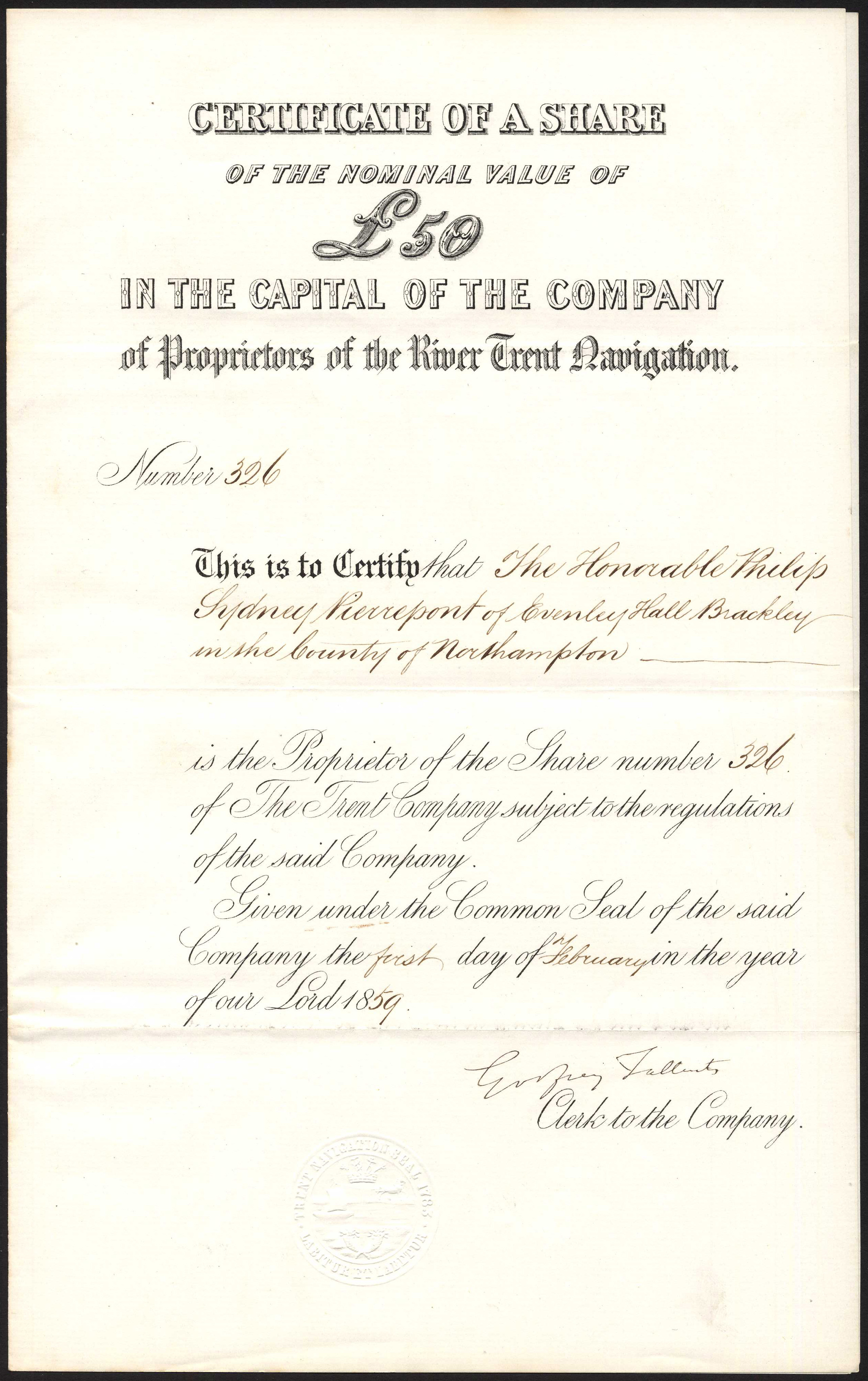
Share of the company of Proprietors of the River Trent Navigation, issued 1. February 1859

Trent Navigation Act 1783
- Act of Parliament
- Parliament of Great Britain
- Long title: An Act for empowering Persons navigating Vessels upon the River Trent, between a Place called Wilden Ferry, in the Counties of Derby and Leicester, or one of them, and the Town of Burton upon Trent, in the County of Stafford, to hale the same with Horses.
- Citation: 23 Geo. 3. c. 41
- Territorial extent: Great Britain

Dates
- Royal assent: 17 April 1783
- Commencement: 5 December 1782 (Note: Start of session.)
Other legislation
Relates to	River Trent Navigation Act 1698; Trent Navigation (No. 2) Act 1783

Status: Amended

Text of statute as originally enacted

The Trent Navigation Company was established by Trent Navigation Act 1783 (23 Geo. 3. c. 41) 'An Act for improving the Navigation of the River Trent'. It was responsible for improving and maintaining the navigation on the river between Wilden Ferry (near Cavendish Bridge) and Gainsborough (with the exception of Averham to South Muskham), and junctions with the various other canals. The first business tackled by the company was the building of towpaths.

Some of the canals opening in the 1790s offered routes for traffic by-passing large sections of the River Trent. By 1796 the Derby Canal connected directly to the Erewash Canal at Sandiacre and the River Trent at Swarkestone. The Nottingham Canal ran from the Erewash Canal junction at Langley Mill, which itself linked to the Cromford Canal, down to the River Trent near Trent Bridge in Nottingham. Coal from Derbyshire could be transported to Nottingham and Derby without using the river.

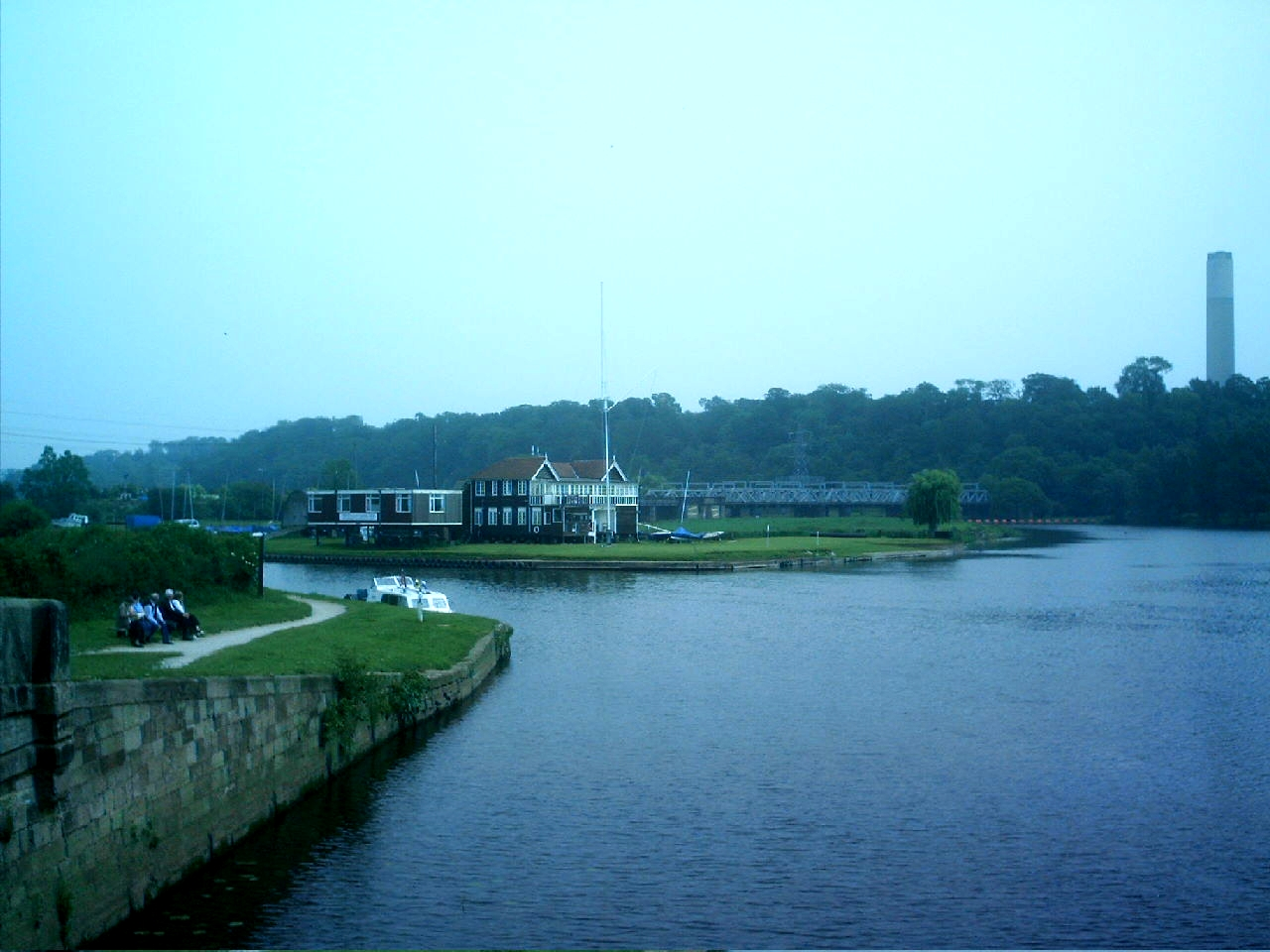
The entrance to Cranfleet Cut

Trent Navigation Act 1794
- Act of Parliament
- Parliament of Great Britain
- Long title: An Act to alter and amend an Act of the twenty third Year of His present Majesty, for improving the Navigation of the River Trent; and for making and maintaining a Navigable Canal from the said River, in the Parish of Beeston, to join the Nottingham, and also certain Cuts on the Side of the said River.
- Citation: 34 Geo. 3. c. 95
- Territorial extent: Great Britain

Dates
- Royal assent: 9 May 1794
- Commencement: 9 May 1794 (Note: The Acts of Parliament (Commencement) Act 1793.)
- Repealed: 14 June 1858
Other legislation
Amends	Trent Navigation (No. 2) Act 1783
Repealed by	Trent Navigation Act 1858

Status: Repealed

Text of statute as originally enacted

The competition prompted the company to implement canals cuts of their own. The Sawley cut, the Cranfleet cut and the Beeston canal provided easier navigation avoiding difficult and shallow sections of the river.

Trent (Burton-upon-Trent and Humber) Navigation Act 1887 (Note: Section 1.)
- Act of Parliament
- Parliament of the United Kingdom
- Long title: An Act to provide for the improvement and maintenance of the Navigation of the River Trent from Wilden Ferry in the counties of Derby and Leicester or one of them to Gainsborough in the county of Lincoln and for other purposes.
- Citation: 50 & 51 Vict. c. cxv
- Territorial extent: United Kingdom

Dates
- Royal assent: 19 July 1887
- Commencement: 19 July 1887

Status: Amended

Text of statute as originally enacted

Trent Navigation Act 1892
- Act of Parliament
- Parliament of the United Kingdom
- Long title: An Act to enable the Trent (Burton-upon-Trent and Humber) Navigation Company to raise additional Capital to change the Name of the Company and for other purposes.
- Citation: 55 & 56 Vict. c. cxxxv
- Territorial extent: United Kingdom

Dates
- Royal assent: 27 June 1892
- Commencement: 27 June 1892

Status: Current legislation

In a minor hiccup in its history, the Trent (Burton-upon-Trent and Humber) Navigation Act 1887 (50 & 51 Vict. c. cxv) caused the company to be taken over by the Trent (Burton-upon-Trent and Humber) Navigation Company. The Trent Navigation Act 1892 (55 & 56 Vict. c. cxxxv) restored the original company name.

Trent Navigation Act 1906
- Act of Parliament
- Parliament of the United Kingdom
- Long title: An Act to authorise the Trent Navigation Company to construct certain new works for improving the navigation of the River Trent between Wilden Ferry and Gainsborough to confer further powers upon the Company and for other purposes.
- Citation: 6 Edw. 7. c. lvii
- Territorial extent: United Kingdom

Dates
- Royal assent: 20 July 1906
- Commencement: 20 July 1906

Status: Current legislation

Nottingham Corporation (Trent Navigation Transfer) Act 1915
- Act of Parliament
- Parliament of the United Kingdom
- Long title: An Act to transfer to the mayor aldermen and citizens of the city of Nottingham part of the undertaking of the Trent Navigation Company and for other purposes.
- Citation: 5 & 6 Geo. 5. c. lxvi
- Territorial extent: United Kingdom

Dates
- Royal assent: 29 July 1915
- Commencement: 29 July 1915
Other legislation
Amended by	Statute Law (Repeals) Act 1995

Status: Amended

Text of statute as originally enacted

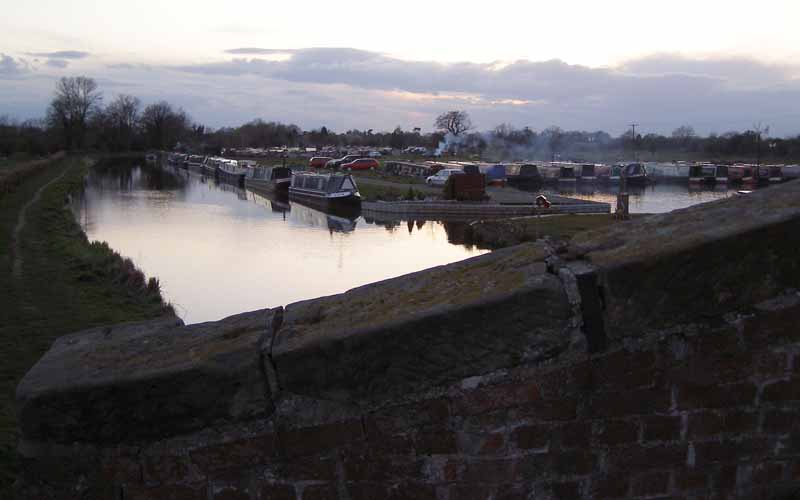
Sawley Cut and Marina

In 1906 the Trent Navigation Company obtained the Trent Navigation Act 1906 (6 Edw. 7. c. lvii) authorising improvements upstream of Newark. However, only one lock at Cromwell was constructed before the outbreak of the First World War. By the Nottingham Corporation (Trent Navigation Transfer) Act 1915 (5 & 6 Geo. 5. c. lxvi), the river from Averham to Nottingham was put under the control of Nottingham Corporation. They implemented improvements to a value of £450,000 (equivalent to £24,440,000 in 2025), which included a new locks and a cut at Holme Lock. The works completed by 1927 enabled larger river boats to sail up to Nottingham from Hull and the continent.

In 1937, the bulk of the Nottingham Canal was closed with the exception of the stretch through Nottingham, from Trent Bridge to the junction with the Beeston Canal at Lenton. This was taken over by the Trent Navigation Company.

The Trent Navigation Company ceased to exist in 1940, when it was taken over by the Trent River Catchment Board. The catchment board was replaced by the Trent River Board in 1951 and by the Trent River Authority in 1965.

== Statistics ==
Annual tonnage carried for the years 1913 to 1926 inclusive 29,062 tons.

- 1928 – 66,960 tons
- 1929 – 83,118 tons
- 1930 – 105,337 tons
- 1931 – 159,315 tons
- 1932 – 284,666 tons
- 1933 – 230,609 tons
- 1934 – 242,853 tons
- 1935 – 222,538 tons
- 1936 – 230,514 tons
- 1937 – 259,321 tons
- 1938 – 275,030 tons

The annual tonnage carried increased more than eight-fold following the Nottingham Corporation assumption of control of part of the Trent Navigation.

== Freight transport ==
In the late 1930s, the powerful motor vessels and dumb barges owned by the company had a total carrying capacity of 4,500 tons. Each day, vessels were in attendance at each of the Hull docks and consignments of five tons and upwards were collected direct overside from steamers. Under an ancient charter, the port of Hull is free to river and canal craft. No wharfage or landing charges were incurred when cargo was directly discharged into the company's boats.

A train of the company's barges could reach Gainsborough within five hours from Hull, and Newark-on-Trent within twelve hours. The journey from Hull to Nottingham took eighteen hours.

A typical train consisted of a mechanically propelled barge carrying 60 tons, towing three dumb barges each of which had 120 tons of goods. The largest trains of barges could carry 600 tons of cargo.
