= Auditor of the imprests =

Office of the English Exchequer, 1559–1785

Auditor of the Imprests was a profitable office of the Exchequer, responsible for auditing the accounts of officers of the English crown to whom money was issued for government expenditure, from 1559 to 1785.

== Foundation ==
Prior to 1559 this duty was carried out sometimes by auditors specially appointed, at other times by the auditors of the land revenue, or by the auditor of the exchequer, an office established as early as 1314. But in 1559 an endeavour was made to systematize the auditing of the public accounts, by the appointment of two auditors of the imprests.

== Work ==
Substantial sums of money had to be issued to officers such as the Treasurer of the Navy and the Paymaster-General of HM Forces. The auditors were responsible for seeing that these officers expended the money issued to them for the purposes intended.

The system operation was defective. The auditors did not audit the actual expenditure of the departments administering the army and navy. Nor was there any mechanism for ensuring that accounts were presented and passed promptly. Indeed the system encouraged abuses. The officers accounting frequently had large sums of money in hand, which they were able to invest until it needed to be spent. Thus a person no longer in office, but with a balance in hand had no incentive to pay it back in to the Exchequer. Furthermore, an ancient statute (51 Hen. 3. c. 5) required that accounts should be cleared in order. This meant that work on auditing a later officer's account could not even begin until that of his predecessor had received its acquittance (Quietus).

The result was that Henry Fox (Lord Holland from 1763), who had been Paymaster-General of Forces between 1757 and 1765 did not have his accounts audited until 1778, 23 years later, during which time he was estimated to have received £250,000 in interest.

== Remuneration and tenure ==
The auditors were paid by fees. This made the offices extremely profitable. In 1703, the office had a salary of £300, but the fees were worth at least £700 more. Its value is demonstrated by the need to pay £7,000 compensation to John Stuart, Lord Mount Stuart when the office was abolished in 1784.

Until the end of the 17th century, auditors were appointed for life by letters patent. During the 17th century reversionary grants of the office were sometimes made. However Edward Harley and most subsequent auditors only held office during pleasure, though in practice, it amounted to the same thing.

== Sinecure ==
By 1745, the office was a sinecure, where all the work was undertaken by the auditor's deputies. In the 1780s, the Commissioners for Examining the Public Accounts were not "able to discover ... any solid Advantage derived to the Public from the Examination given to ... [the public accounts] by the Auditor of Imprests, and, for that Reason, we have suggested the Propriety of exempting them from his Jurisdiction, and the urgent Necessity of relieving the Nation from so heavy, and, to all Appearance, so unnecessary an Expense".

== Abolition ==
During the American War of Independence, the government came under great pressure to ensure that its revenue was properly spent, particularly curbing Civil list expenditure. This led to the passing in 1782 of an Act concerning the office of Paymaster-General (22 Geo. 3. c. 81; the Paymaster General Act 1782) and a Civil Establishments Act (22 Geo. 3. c. 82; the Civil List and Secret Service Money Act 1782, also known as Burke's Civil Establishment Act), the latter abolishing 134 sinecures in the Royal Household. The following year acts required balances to be deposited in the Bank of England. These officers were paid by fee and did their work by deputy, and a further 144 sinecures abolished. This movement ended with the abolition of the auditors of the imprests in 1785 and their replacement by five Commissioners for Auditing the Public Accounts.

== List of auditors ==
Date	In reversion	One	In reversion	Two
1560		John Coddenham		John Hamby
1570		William Dodington		John Hamby
1573		William Dodington		John Conyers
1595		Charles Wednester		John Conyers
1597		Sir Francis Gofton		John Conyers
1604		Sir Francis Gofton	1600	Sir Richard Sutton
1628	1621	Sir Ralph Freeman	1600	Sir Richard Sutton
1632		John Worfield (to 1643)	1600	Sir Richard Sutton
1634		John Worfield (to 1643)	1632	George Bingley (died 1656)
1650	1641	Bartholomew Beale (died 1674)	1632	George Bingley (died 1656)
1660	1641	Bartholomew Beale (died 1674)	1640	John Wood
1670	1641	Bartholomew Beale (died 1674)	1643	Robert Wilde
1672	1641	Bartholomew Beale (died 1674)		Brook Bridges
1674 May	1672	Francis Godolphin		Brook Bridges
1674 Sep		Roger Twisden		Brook Bridges
1675		Sir Richard Langley		Brook Bridges
1677		Thomas Done		Brook Bridges
1703		Edward Harley		Brook Bridges
1705		Edward Harley		Arthur Mainwaring (died 1712)
1713		Edward Harley		Thomas Foley
1735	1717	William Benson		Thomas Foley
1737	1717	William Benson	1720	William Aislabie
1754		Lewis Watson, 1st Baron Sondes	1720	William Aislabie
1781		Lewis Watson, 1st Baron Sondes	1781	John Stuart, Lord Mount Stuart
