= Lord Chamberlain =

Most senior official of the Royal Household of the United Kingdom

Lord Chamberlain of the Household
- Royal Coat of Arms of the United Kingdom

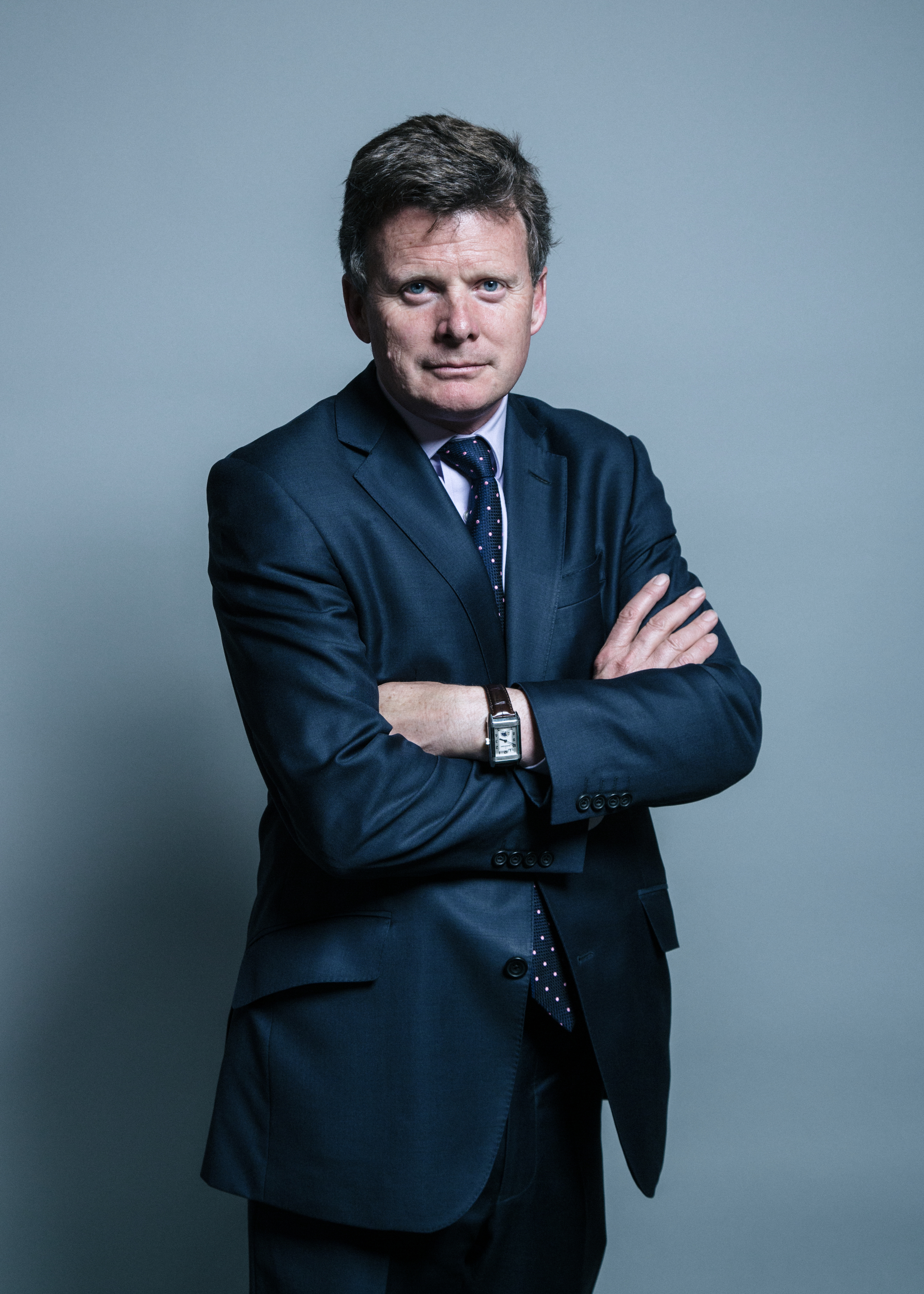
- Incumbent; The Lord Benyon since 4 November 2024
- Lord Chamberlain's Office; Royal Households of the United Kingdom
- Member of: Royal Household of the United Kingdom; His Majesty's Most Honourable Privy Council
- Appointer: His Majesty The King
- Term length: At His Majesty's Pleasure
- Inaugural holder: Sir Thomas Erpingham
- Formation: c. 1399
- Website: Official Website

The lord chamberlain of the Household is the most senior officer of the Royal Household of the United Kingdom, supervising the departments which support and provide advice to the sovereign of the United Kingdom while also acting as the main channel of communication between the sovereign and the House of Lords. The office organises all ceremonial activity such as garden parties, state visits, royal weddings, and the State Opening of Parliament. They also oversee the Royal Mews and royal travel, as well as the ceremony around the awarding of honours.

From 1737 to 1968, the lord chamberlain had the power to decide which plays would be granted a licence for performance; this meant that he had the capacity to censor theatre at his pleasure.

The lord chamberlain is always sworn of the Privy Council, is usually a peer and before 1782 the post was of Cabinet rank. The position was a political one until 1924. The office dates from the Middle Ages when the king's chamberlain often acted as the king's spokesman in Council and Parliament.

The current lord chamberlain is Richard Benyon, Baron Benyon, who has been in office since 4 November 2024.

== Historic role ==
During the early modern period, the lord chamberlain was one of the three principal officers of the Royal Household, the others being the lord steward and the master of the horse. The lord chamberlain was responsible for the "chamber" or the household "above stairs": that is, the series of rooms used by the sovereign to receive increasingly select visitors, terminating in the royal bedchamber (although the bedchamber itself came to operate semi-autonomously under the groom of the stool/stole). His department not only furnished the servants and other personnel (such as physicians and bodyguards, the Yeomen of the Guard and Gentlemen Pensioners) in intimate attendance on the sovereign but also arranged and staffed ceremonies and entertainments for the court. He also had (secular) authority over the Chapel Royal. Under the terms of the Civil List and Secret Service Money Act 1782 (22 Geo. 3. c. 82), the lord chamberlain took on direct responsibility for items kept and maintained by the Great Wardrobe and the Jewel House (whereby these formerly semi-independent sub-departments were abolished).

As other responsibilities of government were devolved to ministers, the ordering of the Royal Household was largely left to the personal taste of the sovereign. To ensure that the chamber reflected the royal tastes, the lord chamberlain received commands directly from the sovereign to be transmitted to the heads of subordinate departments.

In 1594, the lord chamberlain, Henry Carey, 1st Baron Hunsdon, founded the Lord Chamberlain's Men, for which William Shakespeare was a part (and later a shareholder in the company) and for whom he wrote most of his plays during his career. Carey served under Elizabeth I at the time and was in charge of all court entertainment, a duty traditionally given to the master of the revels, a deputy of the lord chamberlain. Later, in 1603, James I, elevated the chamberlain's Men to royal patronage and changed the name to the King's Men.

=== Theatre censorship ===
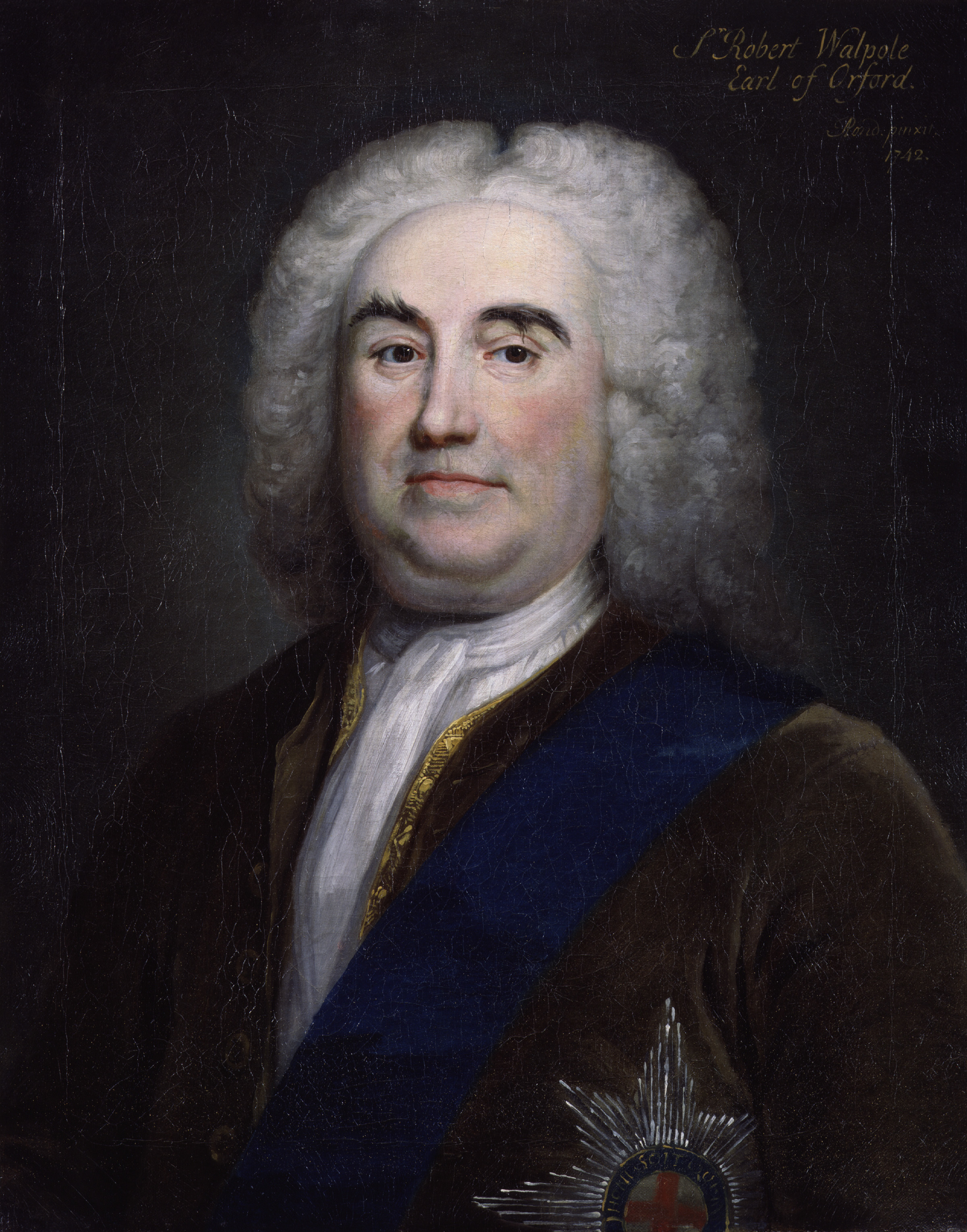
Sir Robert Walpole, the Prime Minister who gave the Lord Chamberlain official censorship duties. Painting by Arthur Pond.

==== The Licensing Act 1737 ====
In 1737, Sir Robert Walpole officially introduced statutory censorship with the Licensing Act 1737 by appointing the lord chamberlain to act as the theatrical censor. The Licensing Act 1737 gave the lord chamberlain the statutory authority to veto the performance of any new plays: he could prevent any new play, or any modification to an existing play, from being performed for any reason, and theatre owners could be prosecuted for staging a play (or part of a play) that had not received prior approval.

Historically, the lord chamberlain had been exercising a commanding authority on London's theatre companies under the royal prerogative for many decades already. But by the 1730s, the theatre was not controlled by royal patronage anymore. Instead, it had become more of a commercial business. Therefore, the fact the lord chamberlain still retained censorship authority for the next 200 years gave him uniquely repressive authority during a period where Britain was experiencing "growing political enfranchisement and liberalization".

Even further confusion rested in the fact that members of Parliament could not present changes to the censorship laws because although the lord chamberlain exercised his authority under statute law, he was still an official whose authority was derived from the royal prerogative.

==== Theatres Act 1843 ====
By the 1830s, it started to become clear that the theatre licensing system in England needed an upgrade. Playwrights, instead of representatives of minor theatres, actually initiated the final push for reform as they felt that their livelihoods were being negatively affected by the monopoly the larger theatres had on the industry, backed by the laws in the Licensing Act 1737.

A select committee was formed in 1832 with the purpose of examining the laws that affected dramatic literature. Their main complaints were the lack of copyright protection for their work and more importantly that only two patent theatres in London could legitimately perform new plays. After more pressure from playwrights and theatre managers, the findings of the committee were finally presented to Parliament.

It was the proposals of this committee that Parliament implemented in the Theatres Act 1843. The act still confirmed the absolute powers of censorship enjoyed by the lord chamberlain but still slightly restricted his powers so that he could only prohibit the performance of plays where he was of the opinion that "it is fitting for the preservation of good manners, decorum or of the public peace so to do". The Act, however, did abolish the monopoly that the patent houses had in London, providing a minor win for playwrights and theatre managers wishing to produce new work.

==== Theatres Act 1968 ====
In 1909, a Joint Select Committee on Stage Plays (Censorship) was established and recommended that the Lord Chamberlain should continue to act as censor but that it could be lawful to perform plays without a licence from the lord chamberlain. However, King Edward VII refused to accept these recommendations. The outbreak of both World Wars put an end to any parliamentary initiatives to change the laws regarding theatre censorship for many years. In 1948, the first British Theatre Conference recommended the termination of theatre censorship with the plan to pursue parliamentary action to ratify this.

In the 1960s, the debate to abolish theatre censorship rose again as a new generation of young playwrights came on the scene. They gained popularity with their new plays in local establishments, but since many were refused a licence by the lord chamberlain, they could not transfer to the West End. In the case of John Osborne's play A Patriot for Me, the lord chamberlain at the time, Cameron Cobbold, 1st Baron Cobbold, was irritated that the play was so widely publicized even though he had banned it and therefore pursued legal action. In the end, the play was allowed to continue as it was. At this point, several widely regarded authors had all been censored by the lord chamberlain at one time or another, including playwrights Henrik Ibsen and George Bernard Shaw. Sometimes censorship was self-serving. A comedy written for the Edinburgh Festival Fringe in the early 1960s had, as its plot, a jocular scheme to steal the crown jewels. The lord chamberlain issued a one-line letter requiring the excision of that plot element. As Michael Palin, one of its authors and performers notes, that meant banning the entire production. Another joint select committee was founded to further debate on the issue and present a solution. This time the argument largely centred on this issue on the portrayal of living and recently dead individuals, particularly in reference to the monarchy as well as politicians.

After much debate, the Theatres Act 1968 was finally passed; it officially abolished the censorship of the stage and repealed the lord chamberlain's power to refuse a licence to a play of any kind. The first London performance of the musical Hair was actually delayed until the act was passed after a licence had been refused.

==== Aftermath ====
The battle regarding the abolition of censorship was largely a political one, fought on principle. Those who opposed the termination of this particular duty of the lord chamberlain were mostly concerned about how to protect the reputation of the royal family and the government instead of controlling obscenity and blasphemy on stage. However, this concern has largely been unfounded. Since the termination of censorship, British drama has flourished and produced several prominent playwrights and new works since. The abolition of censorship opened a floodgate of theatrical creativity.

==== The Lord Chamberlain's plays ====
The long standing role of the lord chamberlain as theatrical censor resulted in an extensive archive of both licensed and unlicensed play scripts being preserved. The collection held at the British Library also includes correspondence and administrative documents related to the censorship process.

== Duties of the office ==
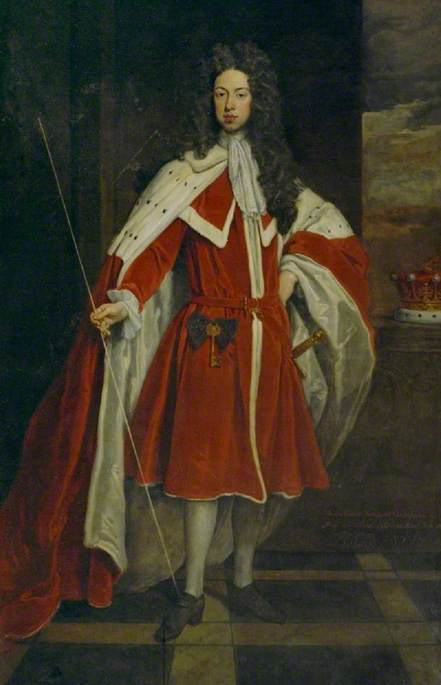
Henry Grey, 12th Earl of Kent in 1705, carrying the wand of office and wearing the insignia of a gold key, as Lord Chamberlain.

The lord chamberlain is the most senior official of the Royal Household and oversees its business, including liaising with the other senior officers of the Household, chairing Heads of Department meetings, and advising in the appointment of senior Household officials. The lord chamberlain also undertakes ceremonial duties and serves as the channel of communication between the Sovereign and the House of Lords.

Under David Ogilvy, 13th Earl of Airlie, the lord chamberlain’s ceremonial and non-executive role was altered to that of chief executive. Airlie initiated changes in the early 1990s under the auspices of "The Way Ahead Group". Under these plans, Queen Elizabeth II agreed to pay tax, greater transparency for the public subsidy of the monarchy began, and a greater emphasis on public relations started. In 1986, he produced a 1,393-page report recommending 188 changes for smoother operations of the Royal Household.

The Lord Chamberlain's Office is a department of the Royal Household and its day-to-day work is headed by the comptroller. It is responsible for organizing ceremonial activities including state visits, investitures, garden parties, the State Opening of Parliament, weddings and funerals.

On state and ceremonial occasions, the lord chamberlain carries specific symbols that represent his office: a white staff and a key (which is worn at the hip pocket). These insignia are returned to the monarch when the lord chamberlain retires from office; but if the monarch dies, the white staff is symbolically broken by the lord chamberlain and placed on the coffin of the deceased sovereign at the end of the state funeral service. This was last done by Andrew Parker, Baron Parker of Minsmere, who broke his staff over the coffin of Elizabeth II in 2022.

The lord chamberlain is ex-officio the chancellor of the Royal Victorian Order, having possession of a Badge corresponding to that office. As such, they are often appointed to the said order either upon appointment as lord chamberlain, or later in their career. The lord chamberlain also regulates the design and the wearing of court uniform and dress and how insignia are worn.

== List of lords chamberlain from 1399 ==
Name	Began	Ended	Notes	Ref.
Sir Thomas Erpingham	1399	1404		
Richard Grey, 4th Baron Grey of Codnor	1404	1413		
Henry FitzHugh, 3rd Baron FitzHugh	1413	1425		
Ralph de Cromwell, 3rd Baron Cromwell	c. 1425	1432	First period in office	
William Phelip, 6th Baron Bardolf	1432	1441		
Sir Ralph Boteler, from 1441 The Lord Sudeley	1441	1447		
James Fiennes, 1st Baron Saye and Sele	1447	1450		
Ralph de Cromwell, 3rd Baron Cromwell	1450	1455	Second period in office	
Thomas Stanley, from 1456 The Lord Stanley	1455	1459		
Richard Neville, 5th Earl of Salisbury	1460	1460		
William Hastings, 1st Baron Hastings	1461	1470	First period in office	
Unknown	1470	1471	Second reign of Henry VI	
William Hastings, 1st Baron Hastings	1471	1483	Second period in office	
Francis Lovell, 1st Viscount Lovell	1483	1485		
Sir William Stanley	1485	1494		
Giles Daubeney, 1st Baron Daubeney	1494	1508		
Charles Somerset, 1st Baron Herbert, from 1514 Earl of Worcester	1509	1526		
William Fitzalan, 11th Earl of Arundel	1526	1530		
William Sandys, 1st Baron Sandys	1530	1540		
Vacant	1540	1543		
William Paulet, 1st Baron St John	1543	1545	Created Earl of Wiltshire in 1550 and Marquess of Winchester in 1551	
Unknown	1545	1546		
Henry Fitzalan, 12th Earl of Arundel	1546	1550		
Thomas Wentworth, 1st Baron Wentworth	1550	1551		
Thomas Darcy, 1st Baron Darcy of Chiche	1551	1553		
Sir John Gage	1553	1556		
Unknown	1556	1557		
Sir Edward Hastings from 1558 Lord Hastings of Loughborough	1557	1558		
William Howard, 1st Baron Howard of Effingham	1558	1572		
Thomas Radclyffe, 3rd Earl of Sussex	1572	1585		
Henry Carey, 1st Baron Hunsdon	1585	1596	Founded the famous Lord Chamberlain's Men for whom Shakespeare wrote for most of his career.	
William Brooke, 10th Baron Cobham	1596	1597		
George Carey, 2nd Baron Hunsdon	1597	1603		
Thomas Howard, 1st Earl of Suffolk, from 1603 The Earl of Suffolk	1603	1614		
Robert Carr, 1st Earl of Somerset	1614	1615		
William Herbert, 3rd Earl of Pembroke	1615	1626		
Philip Herbert, 4th Earl of Pembroke, from 1630 Earl of Pembroke	1626	1641		
Robert Devereux, 3rd Earl of Essex	1641	1642		
Unknown	1642	1644		
Edward Sackville, 4th Earl of Dorset	1644	1649		
Vacant	1649	1655	Position became vacant at the start of the Interregnum and the Commonwealth	
Sir Gilbert Pickering, 1st Baronet	1655	1659	Lord Chamberlain during The Protectorate	
Edward Montagu, 2nd Earl of Manchester	1660	1671		
Henry Jermyn, 1st Earl of St Albans	1672	1674		
Henry Bennet, 1st Earl of Arlington	1674	1685		
Robert Bruce, 1st Earl of Ailesbury, 2nd Earl of Elgin	1685	1685		
John Sheffield, 3rd Earl of Mulgrave	1685	1688	Created Marquess of Normanby in 1694 and Duke of Buckingham and Normanby in 1703	
Charles Sackville, 6th Earl of Dorset	1689	1697		
Robert Spencer, 2nd Earl of Sunderland	1697	1697		
Vacant	1697	1699	William III did not accept the resignation of the Earl of Sunderland	
Charles Talbot, 1st Duke of Shrewsbury	1699	1700		
Edward Villiers, 1st Earl of Jersey	1700	1704		
Henry Grey, 12th Earl of Kent from 1706 The Marquess of Kent	1704	1710	Created Duke of Kent in 1710 and Marquess Grey in 1740	
Charles Talbot, 1st Duke of Shrewsbury	1710	1715		
Charles Paulet, 2nd Duke of Bolton	1715	1717		
Thomas Pelham-Holles, 1st Duke of Newcastle	1717	1724		
Charles FitzRoy, 2nd Duke of Grafton	1724	1757		
William Cavendish, 4th Duke of Devonshire	1757	1762		
George Spencer, 4th Duke of Marlborough	1762	1763		
Granville Leveson-Gower, 2nd Earl Gower	1763	1765	Created Marquess of Stafford in 1786	
William Cavendish-Bentinck, 3rd Duke of Portland	1765	1766		
Francis Seymour-Conway, 1st Earl of Hertford	1766	1782	First period in office; created Marquess of Hertford in 1793	
George Montagu, 4th Duke of Manchester	1782	1783		
Francis Seymour-Conway, 1st Earl of Hertford	1783	1783	Second period in office	
James Cecil, 7th Earl of Salisbury, from 1789 Marquess of Salisbury	1783	1804		
George Legge, 3rd Earl of Dartmouth	1804	1810		
Vacant	1810	1812		
Francis Ingram-Seymour-Conway, 2nd Marquess of Hertford	1812	1821		
James Graham, 3rd Duke of Montrose	1821	1827	First period in office	
William Cavendish, 6th Duke of Devonshire	1827	1828	First period in office	
James Graham, 3rd Duke of Montrose	1828	1830	Second period in office	
George Child Villiers, 5th Earl of Jersey	1830	1830	First period in office	
William Cavendish, 6th Duke of Devonshire	1830	1834	Second period in office	
George Child Villiers, 5th Earl of Jersey	1834	1835	Second period in office	
Richard Wellesley, 1st Marquess Wellesley	1835	1835		
Francis Conyngham, 2nd Marquess Conyngham	1835	1839		
Henry Paget, Earl of Uxbridge	1839	1841	Succeeded as Marquess of Anglesey in 1854	
George Sackville-West, 5th Earl De La Warr	1841	1846	First period in office	
Frederick Spencer, 4th Earl Spencer	1846	1848		
John Campbell, 2nd Marquess of Breadalbane	1848	1852	First period in office	
Brownlow Cecil, 2nd Marquess of Exeter	1852	1852		
John Campbell, 2nd Marquess of Breadalbane	1853	1858	Second period in office	
George Sackville-West, 5th Earl De La Warr	1858	1859	Second period in office	
John Townshend, 3rd Viscount Sydney	1859	1866	First period in office	
Orlando Bridgeman, 3rd Earl of Bradford	1866	1868		
John Townshend, 3rd Viscount Sydney	1868	1874	Second period in office; created Earl Sydney in 1874	
Francis Seymour, 5th Marquess of Hertford	1874	1879		
William Edgcumbe, 4th Earl of Mount Edgcumbe	1879	1880		
Valentine Browne, 4th Earl of Kenmare	1880	1885	First period in office	
Edward Bootle-Wilbraham, 1st Earl of Lathom	1885	1886	First period in office	
Valentine Browne, 4th Earl of Kenmare	1886	1886	Second period in office	
Edward Bootle-Wilbraham, 1st Earl of Lathom	1886	1892	Second period in office	
Charles Wynn-Carington, 1st Earl Carrington	1892	1895	Created Earl Carrington in 1895 and Marquess of Lincolnshire in 1912	
Edward Bootle-Wilbraham, 1st Earl of Lathom	1895	1898	Third period in office	
John Hope, 7th Earl of Hopetoun	1898	1900	Created Marquess of Linlithgow in 1902	
Edward Villiers, 5th Earl of Clarendon	1900	1905		
Charles Spencer, Viscount Althorp from 1910 Earl Spencer	1905	1912		
William Mansfield, 2nd Baron Sandhurst from 1917 Viscount Sandhurst	1912	1921		
John Stewart-Murray, 8th Duke of Atholl	1921	1922		
Rowland Baring, 2nd Earl of Cromer	1922	1938		
George Villiers, 6th Earl of Clarendon	1938	1952		
Roger Lumley, 11th Earl of Scarbrough	1952	1963		
Cameron Cobbold, 1st Baron Cobbold	29 January 1963	30 November 1971		
Charles Maclean, Baron Maclean	1 December 1971	30 November 1984		
David Ogilvy, 13th Earl of Airlie	1 December 1984	31 December 1997		
Thomas Stonor, 7th Baron Camoys	1 January 1998	31 May 2000		
Richard Luce, Baron Luce	1 October 2000	15 October 2006		
William Peel, 3rd Earl Peel	16 October 2006	31 March 2021		
Andrew Parker, Baron Parker of Minsmere	1 April 2021	4 November 2024		
Richard Benyon, Baron Benyon	4 November 2024	present		

== See also ==
- List of Lords Chamberlain to British royal consorts
- Lord Chamberlain's Office
- Central Chancery of the Orders of Knighthood
