= Bartholomew Beale =

English bureaucrat

Bartholomew Beale (died 8 May 1674) was an English bureaucrat of the Commonwealth and Restoration periods.

Beale was the third son of Bartholomew Beale, of Walton, Buckinghamshire. His elder brother, Charles, was the husband of the portrait painter Mary Beale.

Educated at Peterhouse, Cambridge, Beale was admitted to Gray's Inn on 18 June 1639. He obtained the reversion of the office of auditor of the imprests for life on 17 August 1641, and took up the post in 1650. A relative of Samuel Pepys by marriage, Beale appears several times in Pepys' diaries, and his methods seem to have met with approval:

After dinner by coach with Sir G. Carteret and Sir J. Minnes by appointment to Auditor Beale's in Salisbury Court, and there we did with great content look over some old ledgers to see in what manner they were kept, and indeed it was in an extraordinary good method.

The office of auditor, which required Beale to examine the books of various officials who spent government money "on account", was a fairly lucrative one. With the emoluments from his employment, Beale was able to purchase Hopton Castle, Shropshire, which remained in the family for several generations. He also owned a house in Hatton Garden, London. On 8 May 1674, Beale died by suicide, "throwing himself downe in his frantick fitt" from the upper window of this house, much to the puzzlement of his contemporaries. His wife, the former Miss Hunt, survived him, as did two children, the eldest also named Bartholomew. He left them a large estate, and was in no financial difficulties at the time of his death.

Political offices
| Preceded by John Worfield | Auditor of the Imprests; 1650–1674 | Succeeded by Francis Godolphin |
