= Volunteers Act 1782 =

Act of the Parliament of Great Britain

- Act of Parliament
- Parliament of Great Britain
- Long title: An Act for the Encouragement and disciplining of such Corps or Companies of Men as shall voluntarily enroll themselves for Defence of their Towns or Coasts, or for the general Defence of the Kingdom, during the present War.
- Citation: 22 Geo. 3. c. 79
- Territorial extent: Great Britain

Dates
- Royal assent: 11 July 1782
- Commencement: 27 November 1781 (Note: Start of session.)
- Repealed: 21 August 1871
Other legislation
Repealed by	Statute Law Revision Act 1871

Status: Repealed

Text of statute as originally enacted

The Volunteers Act 1782 (22 Geo. 3. c. 79) was an act of the Parliament of Great Britain which established military regulations for the many part-time units that were raised in Britain during the American War of Independence.

== Subsequent developments ==
The whole act was repealed by section 1 of, and the schedule to, the Statute Law Revision Act 1871 (34 & 35 Vict. c. 116), which came into force on 21 August 1871.
