= Paymaster General Act 1782 =

Act of the Parliament of Great Britain

- Act of Parliament
- Parliament of Great Britain
- Long title: An Act for the better Regulation of the Office of Paymaster General of His Majesty's Forces.
- Citation: 22 Geo. 3. c. 81
- Territorial extent: Great Britain

Dates
- Royal assent: 11 July 1782
- Commencement: 1 January 1783 (Note: Section 1.)
- Repealed: 5 December 1782
Other legislation
Repealed by	Paymaster-General Act 1783
Relates to	Civil List and Secret Service Money Act 1782

Status: Repealed

Text of statute as originally enacted

The Paymaster General Act 1782 (22 Geo. 3. c. 81) was an act of the Parliament of Great Britain.

The act abolished the practice of the heads of subordinate treasuries keeping large sums of public money for long periods, during which they employed them for their own profit.

It related to the Paymaster of the Forces.

== Subsequent developments ==
The whole act was repealed by section 1 of the Paymaster-General Act 1783 (23 Geo. 3. c. 50).
