= Civil List and Secret Service Money Act 1782 =

Act of the Parliament of Great Britain

Civil List and Secret Service Money Act 1782 (Note: The citation of this act by this short title was authorised by section 1 of, and the first schedule to, the Short Titles Act 1896. Due to the repeal of those provisions it is now authorised by section 19(2) of the Interpretation Act 1978.)
- Act of Parliament
- Parliament of Great Britain
- Long title: An Act for enabling his Majesty to discharge the Debt contracted upon his Civil List Revenues; and for preventing the same from being in Arrear for the future, by regulating the Mode of Payments out of the said Revenues, and by suppressing or regulating certain Offices therein mentioned, which are now paid out of the Revenues of the Civil List.
- Citation: 22 Geo. 3. c. 82
- Territorial extent: Great Britain

Dates
- Royal assent: 11 July 1782
- Commencement: 27 November 1781 (Note: Start of session.)
- Repealed: 5 November 1993

Other legislation
- Amended by: Statute Law Revision Act 1871; Statute Law Revision Act 1872; Civil Procedure Acts Repeal Act 1879; Statute Law Revision Act 1888; Statute Law Revision Act 1948; House of Commons Disqualification Act 1957; Statute Law (Repeals) Act 1977
- Repealed by: Statute Law (Repeals) Act 1993
- Relates to: Paymaster General Act 1782

Status: Repealed

Text of statute as originally enacted

Revised text of statute as amended

The Civil List and Secret Service Money Act 1782 (22 Geo. 3. c. 82) was an act of the Parliament of Great Britain. The power over the expenditure in the King's household was transferred to the Treasury, and branches of which were regulated. No pension over £300 was to be granted if the total pension list amounted to over £90,000. Thereafter, no pension was to be above £1,300 unless it was granted to members of the royal family or granted by Parliament. Secret service money employed domestically was similarly limited.

== Abolition of offices ==
The act abolished a number of offices in the Government and in the Royal Household. The government offices suppressed were the Secretary of State for the Colonies, the Commissioners for Trade and Plantations (which, with the loss of the American War of Independence, had been dismissed earlier by King George III on 2 May 1782), and the Lords of Police in Scotland. In the Household, the principal officers of the Office of Works, the Great Wardrobe, and the Jewel Office, the Treasurer of the Chamber, the Cofferer of the Household, the six Clerks of the Green Cloth, the Paymaster of the Pensions, the Master of the Harriers, and the Master of the Staghounds were all done away with.

== Subsequent developments ==
Sections 1, 3, 6–12 and 18 of the act were repealed by section 1 of, and the schedule to, the Statute Law Revision Act 1871 (34 & 35 Vict. c. 116), which came into force on 21 August 1871.

Sections 4, 14, 16, 17, 19–23, 31–36 and 38–41 were repealed by section 1 of, and the schedule to, the Statute Law Revision Act 1872 (35 & 36 Vict. c. 63), which came into force on 6 August 1872.

Section 5 of the act was repealed by section 2 of, and part I of the schedule to, the Civil Procedure Acts Repeal Act 1879 (42 & 43 Vict. c. 59), which came into force on 15 August 1879.

Sections 24–29 of the act were repealed by section 1(1) of, and part II of schedule 1 to, the Statute Law (Repeals) Act 1977, which came into force on 16 June 1977.

The whole act was repealed by section 1(1) of, and group 1 of part XI of the schedule 1 to, the Statute Law (Repeals) Act 1993, which came into force on 5 November 1993.
