= List of acts of the Parliament of Great Britain from 1782 =

This is a complete list of acts of the Parliament of Great Britain for the year 1782.

For acts passed until 1707, see the list of acts of the Parliament of England and the list of acts of the Parliament of Scotland. See also the list of acts of the Parliament of Ireland.

For acts passed from 1801 onwards, see the list of acts of the Parliament of the United Kingdom. For acts of the devolved parliaments and assemblies in the United Kingdom, see the list of acts of the Scottish Parliament, the list of acts of the Northern Ireland Assembly, and the list of acts and measures of Senedd Cymru; see also the list of acts of the Parliament of Northern Ireland.

The number shown after each act's title is its chapter number. Acts are cited using this number, preceded by the year(s) of the reign during which the relevant parliamentary session was held; thus the Union with Ireland Act 1800 is cited as "39 & 40 Geo. 3. c. 67", meaning the 67th act passed during the session that started in the 39th year of the reign of George III and which finished in the 40th year of that reign. Note that the modern convention is to use Arabic numerals in citations (thus "41 Geo. 3" rather than "41 Geo. III"). Acts of the last session of the Parliament of Great Britain and the first session of the Parliament of the United Kingdom are both cited as "41 Geo. 3".

Acts passed by the Parliament of Great Britain did not have a short title; however, some of these acts have subsequently been given a short title by acts of the Parliament of the United Kingdom (such as the Short Titles Act 1896).

Before the Acts of Parliament (Commencement) Act 1793 came into force on 8 April 1793, acts passed by the Parliament of Great Britain were deemed to have come into effect on the first day of the session in which they were passed. Because of this, the years given in the list below may in fact be the year before a particular act was passed.

== 22 Geo. 3 ==
The second session of the 15th Parliament of Great Britain, which met from 27 November 1781 until 11 July 1782.

This session was also traditionally cited as 22 G. 3.

=== Public acts ===
Short title	Citation	Royal assent
Long title
Habeas Corpus Suspension Act 1782 (repealed)	22 Geo. 3. c. 1	20 December 1781
An Act for further continuing an Act made in the Seventeenth Year of the Reign of His present Majesty, intituled, "An Act to empower His Majesty to secure and detain Persons charged with, or suspected of the Crime of High Treason, committed in any of His Majesty's Colonies or Plantations in America, or on the High Seas, or the Crime of Piracy." (Note: Habeas Corpus Suspension Act 1776 (17 Geo. 3. c. 9)) (Repealed by Statute Law Revision Act 1871 (34 & 35 Vict. c. 116))
Land Tax Act 1782 (repealed)	22 Geo. 3. c. 2	20 December 1781
An Act for granting an Aid to His Majesty by a Land Tax to be raised in Great Britain, for the Service of the Year One thousand seven hundred and eighty-two. (Repealed by Statute Law Revision Act 1871 (34 & 35 Vict. c. 116))
Malt Duties Act 1782 (repealed)	22 Geo. 3. c. 3	20 December 1781
An Act for continuing and granting to His Majesty certain Duties upon Malt, Mum, Cyder and Perry, for the Service of the Year One thousand seven hundred and eighty-two. (Repealed by Statute Law Revision Act 1871 (34 & 35 Vict. c. 116))
Mutiny Act 1782 (repealed)	22 Geo. 3. c. 4	12 March 1782
An Act for punishing Mutiny and Desertion; and for the better Payment of the Army and their Quarters. (Repealed by Statute Law Revision Act 1871 (34 & 35 Vict. c. 116))
Marine Mutiny Act 1782 (repealed)	22 Geo. 3. c. 5	25 March 1782
An Act for the Regulation of His Majesty's Marine Forces while on Shore. (Repealed by Statute Law Revision Act 1871 (34 & 35 Vict. c. 116))
Militia Act 1782 (repealed)	22 Geo. 3. c. 6	12 March 1782
An Act for keeping the Militia Forces of this Kingdom complete, during the Time therein mentioned. (Repealed by Statute Law Revision Act 1871 (34 & 35 Vict. c. 116))
Importation Act 1782 (repealed)	22 Geo. 3. c. 7	12 March 1782
An Act for further continuing an Act made in the Nineteenth Year of the Reign of His present Majesty, (Note: Importation of Silk Act 1779 (19 Geo. 3. c. 9)) for allowing the Importation of fine organzined Italian Thrown Silk, in any Ships or Vessels, for a limited Time. (Repealed by Statute Law Revision Act 1871 (34 & 35 Vict. c. 116))
National Debt Act 1782 (repealed)	22 Geo. 3. c. 8	12 March 1782
An Act for raising a certain Sum of Money by Way of Annuities, and for establishing a Lottery. (Repealed by Statute Law Revision Act 1870 (33 & 34 Vict. c. 69))
Land Tax (Commissioners) Act 1782 (repealed)	22 Geo. 3. c. 9	25 March 1782
An Act for rectifying Mistakes in the Names of several of the Commissioners appointed by an Act made in the last Session of Parliament (Note: Land Tax (Commissioners) Act 1781 (21 Geo. 3. c. 23)) to put in Execution an Act made in the same Session, intituled, "An Act for granting an Aid to His Majesty by a Land Tax to be raised in Great Britain, for the Service of the Year One thousand seven hundred and eighty-one;" (Note: Land Tax Act 1781 (21 Geo. 3. c. 3)) and for appointing other Commissioners, together with those named in the first mentioned Act, to put in Execution an Act of this Session of Parliament, (Note: Land Tax Act 1782 (22 Geo. 3. c. 2)) for granting an Aid to His Majesty by a Land Tax to be raised in Great Britain, for the Service of the Year One thousand seven hundred and eighty-two. (Repealed by Statute Law Revision Act 1871 (34 & 35 Vict. c. 116))
Exchange of American Prisoners Act 1782 (repealed)	22 Geo. 3. c. 10	25 March 1782
An Act for the better detaining and more easy Exchange of American Prisoners brought into Great Britain. (Repealed by Statute Law Revision Act 1871 (34 & 35 Vict. c. 116))
Negotiations of Certain Bonds Act 1782 (repealed)	22 Geo. 3. c. 11	25 March 1782
An Act for allowing further Time to negotiate by Indorsement, the Bonds issued in pursuance of an Act made in the Fourteenth Year of the Reign of His present Majesty, intituled, "An Act for more effectually carrying into Execution certain Proposals made by the most Noble Henry Duke of Buccleugh, the most Noble Charles Duke of Queensberry and Dover, and others, for redeeming the Annuities granted by the Company of the Bank of Ayr, in that Part of Great Britain called Scotland, known under the Firm of Douglas, Heron and Company." (Note: Bank of Ayr Act 1774 (14 Geo. 3. c. 21)) (Repealed by Statute Law Revision Act 1871 (34 & 35 Vict. c. 116))
Plymouth Fortifications Act 1782	22 Geo. 3. c. 12	25 March 1782
An Act for making Compensation to the Proprietors of certain Messuages, Lands, Tenements and Hereditaments in the Counties of Cornwall and Devon, purchased in pursuance of Two Acts of Parliament, one made in the Twentieth Year of the Reign of His present Majesty, (Note: Plymouth, Sheerness, Gravesend, Tilbury (Fortifications) Act 1780 (20 Geo. 3. c. 38)) for better securing His Majesty's Docks, Ships and Stores at Plymouth and Sheerness, and for better defending the Passage of the River Thames at Gravesend and Tilbury Fort; and the other in the Twenty-first Year of His present Majesty's Reign, (Note: Plymouth Fortifications Act 1781 (21 Geo. 3. c. 61)) for explaining and amending so much of the said Act as relates to the Security of His Majesty's Docks, Ships and Stores at Plymouth; and to certain Proprietors and Occupiers of Land at or near Plymouth, who have sustained any Loss or Damage in consequence of the said Acts.
Continuance of Laws Act 1782 (repealed)	22 Geo. 3. c. 13	25 March 1782
An Act to continue several Laws therein mentioned, relating to the better Encouragement of the making of Sail Cloth in Great Britain; to the Encouragement of the Silk Manufactures; and for taking off several Duties on Merchandize exported, and reducing other Duties; to the free Importation of Cochineal and Indigo; to the prohibiting the Importation of Books re-printed Abroad, and first composed, written and printed in Great Britain; to securing the Duties upon Foreign made Sail Cloth, and charging Foreign made Sails with a Duty; to the allowing a Bounty on the Exportation of British Corn and Grain in Neutral Ships; to the allowing the Exportation of Provisions, Goods, Wares and Merchandizes to certain Places in North America, which are or may be under the Protection of His Majesty's Arms, and from such Places to Great Britain and other Parts of His Majesty's Dominions; to the empowering His Majesty to prohibit the Exportation and restrain the carrying Coastwise of Copper in Bars or Copper in Sheets; and to the allowing the Exportation of certain Quantities of Wheat and other Articles to His Majesty's Sugar Colonies in America. (Repealed by Statute Law Revision Act 1871 (34 & 35 Vict. c. 116))
Stourbridge Canal Act 1782	22 Geo. 3. c. 14	25 March 1782
An Act to explain, amend and render more effectual an Act made in the Sixteenth Year of the Reign of His present Majesty, (Note: Stourbridge Canal Act 1776 (16 Geo. 3. c. 28)) for making and maintaining a Navigable Canal from or near the Town of Stourbridge, in the County of Worcester, to join the Staffordshire and Worcestershire Canal at or near Stourton, in the County of Stafford; and also Two collateral Cuts therein mentioned.
Prize Act 1782 (repealed)	22 Geo. 3. c. 15	25 March 1782
An Act for the Relief of Naval Officers, Seamen, Marines and Soldiers, with respect to Prize and Bounty Money not claimed in due Time. (Repealed by Naval Prize Acts Repeal Act 1864 (27 & 28 Vict. c. 23))
Navigation Act 1782 (repealed)	22 Geo. 3. c. 16	25 March 1782
An Act for the better Supply of Mariners and Seamen to serve in His Majesty's Ships of War, and on board Merchant Ships and other Trading Ships and Vessels. (Repealed by Statute Law Revision Act 1871 (34 & 35 Vict. c. 116))
Cobham, Leatherhead and Godalming Bridges Act 1782	22 Geo. 3. c. 17	25 March 1782
An Act to repair, enlarge and rebuild Cobham, Leatherhead and Godalming Bridges, in the County of Surrey.
Dalkeith Beer Duties Act 1782 (repealed)	22 Geo. 3. c. 18	25 March 1782
An Act for continuing the Term and Powers of an Act made in the Thirty-third Year of the Reign of His late Majesty King George the Second, intituled, "An Act for laying a Duty of Two Pennies Scots, or One-sixth Part of a Penny Sterling, on every Scots Pint of Ale, Porter or Beer brewed for Sale, or vended within the Town and Parish of Dalkeith." (Note: Dalkeith Beer Duties Act 1759 (33 Geo. 2. c. 53)) (Repealed by Statute Law Revision Act 1948 (11 & 12 Geo. 6. c. 62))
Greenland, etc., Fishery Act 1782 (repealed)	22 Geo. 3. c. 19	3 May 1782
An Act for granting an additional Bounty on Ships employed in the Greenland and Whale Fishery, for a limited Time. (Repealed by Statute Law Revision Act 1871 (34 & 35 Vict. c. 116))
Customs Act 1782 (repealed)	22 Geo. 3. c. 20	3 May 1782
An Act to revive and further continue an Act made in the Seventh Year of the Reign of His present Majesty, intituled, "An Act to discontinue for a limited Time the Duties payable upon the Importation of Tallow, Hog's Lard and Grease." (Note: Importation (No. 6) Act 1766 (7 Geo. 3. c. 12)) (Repealed by Statute Law Revision Act 1871 (34 & 35 Vict. c. 116))
Customs (No. 2) Act 1782 (repealed)	22 Geo. 3. c. 21	3 May 1782
An Act to extend so much of Two Acts of the Twentieth (Note: Prize Act 1780 (20 Geo. 3. c. 9)) and Twenty-first (Note: Prize Act 1781 (21 Geo. 3. c. 5)) Years of His present Majesty's Reign, as relate to the Sale of, and ascertaining the Duties upon East India Goods, to Tea and all other Goods of the Growth, Product or Manufacture of China, or any Country within the Limits of the East India Company's Charter, which have been or shall during the present Hostilities be brought into this Kingdom, and condemned as Prize; for equalizing the Duties upon and regulating the Importation of Foreign Snuff into this Kingdom; and for preventing the Importation and Running of Foreign Spirituous Liquors, Tea and other prohibited Goods into this Kingdom in Vessels fitted out and armed as Privateers. (Repealed by Statute Law Revision Act 1861 (24 & 25 Vict. c. 101))
Yarmouth Coal Import Duties (Privileges of Freemen, etc.) Act 1782 (repealed)	22 Geo. 3. c. 22	3 May 1782
An Act for the better securing the Duties payable by virtue of an Act of the Fifth Year of the Reign of Queen Anne, (Note: Yarmouth Coal Import Duties (Freemen, etc.) Act 1706 (6 Ann. c. 10)) on the Importation of Coals, Culm and Cinders into the Port of Great Yarmouth, in the County of Norfolk. (Repealed by Statute Law Revision Act 1948 (11 & 12 Geo. 6. c. 62))
Papists Act 1782 (repealed)	22 Geo. 3. c. 23	3 May 1782
An Act for allowing further Time for Enrollment of Deeds and Wills made by Papists, and for Relief of Protestant Purchasers. (Repealed by Statute Law Revision Act 1871 (34 & 35 Vict. c. 116))
Militia Pay Act 1782 (repealed)	22 Geo. 3. c. 24	3 May 1782
An Act for defraying the Charge of the Pay and Cloathing of the Militia in that Part of Great Britain called England, for One Year, beginning the Twenty-fifth Day of March One thousand seven hundred and eighty-two. (Repealed by Statute Law Revision Act 1871 (34 & 35 Vict. c. 116))
Prize (No. 2) Act 1782 or the Ransom Act 1782 (repealed)	22 Geo. 3. c. 25	3 May 1782
An Act to prohibit the ransoming of Ships or Vessels captured from His Majesty's Subjects, and of the Merchandize or Goods on board such Ships or Vessels. (Repealed by Naval Prize Acts Repeal Act 1864 (27 & 28 Vict. c. 23))
Quarters for Certain Troops Act 1782 (repealed)	22 Geo. 3. c. 26	3 May 1782
An Act for providing Quarters for certain Foreign Troops lately employed in His Majesty's Service in the Defence of the Island of Minorca, and expected to arrive soon in this Kingdom, for a limited Time. (Repealed by Statute Law Revision Act 1871 (34 & 35 Vict. c. 116))
Kent (Small Debts) Act 1782 (repealed)	22 Geo. 3. c. 27	3 May 1782
An Act for the more easy and speedy Recovery of Small Debts within the City of Rochester, and the Parishes of Strood, Higham, Frindsbury, Cobham, Shorne, Cliffe, Cooling, High Halstow, Chalk, Hoo, Burham, Wouldham, Halling, Cuxstone, Chatham and Gillingham, and the Ville of Sheerness, in the County of Kent. (Repealed by Rochester, &c. Court of Requests Act 1808 (48 Geo. 3. c. li) and County Courts Act 1846 (9 & 10 Vict. c. 95))
Customs (No. 3) Act 1782 (repealed)	22 Geo. 3. c. 28	17 May 1782
An Act for granting an additional Duty upon Tobacco and Snuff, and for repealing certain Duties payable upon the Importation of Brandy and Arrack, and for granting other Duties in lieu thereof. (Repealed by Statute Law Revision Act 1861 (24 & 25 Vict. c. 101))
Parliament (No. 1) Act 1782 (repealed)	22 Geo. 3. c. 29	17 May 1782
An Act for further continuing an Act made in the Twentieth Year of the Reign of His present Majesty, (Note: Parliament (No. 2) Act 1780 (20 Geo. 3. c. 50)) intituled, "An Act for exempting the City of Winchester, the County of Southampton, the Town of Shrewsbury, and the County of Salop, out of the Provisions of an Act made in the Eighth Year of the Reign of His late Majesty King George the Second, (Note: Parliamentary Elections Act 1734 (8 Geo. 2. c. 30)) intituled, 'An Act for regulating the Quartering of Soldiers during the Time of the Elections of Members to serve in Parliament;' so far as the same relates to the Removal of Troops during the Elections of Members to serve in Parliament for a limited Time." (Repealed by Statute Law Revision Act 1871 (34 & 35 Vict. c. 116))
Importation (No. 2) Act 1782 (repealed)	22 Geo. 3. c. 30	17 May 1782
An Act for allowing the Importation of Goods of the Growth, Produce or Manufacture of the Islands of Saint Christopher Nevis and Montserrat, into any Ports of His Majesty's Dominions in Europe or America, upon Payment of the British Plantation Duties. (Repealed by Importation (No. 4) Act 1783 (23 Geo. 3. c. 14))
Parliamentary Elections (Cricklade) Act 1782 (repealed)	22 Geo. 3. c. 31	17 May 1782
An Act for the preventing of Bribery and Corruption in the Election of Members to serve in Parliament for the Borough of Cricklade, in the County of Wilts. (Repealed by Ballot Act 1872 (35 & 36 Vict. c. 33))
Coals (Newcastle) Act 1782	22 Geo. 3. c. 32	17 May 1782
An Act to revive and continue an Act, passed in the Sixth Year of the Reign of His present Majesty, intituled, "An Act to regulate the Loading of Ships with Coals, in the Ports of Newcastle and Sunderland." (Note: Coal Loading (Newcastle and Sunderland) Act 1766 (6 Geo. 3. c. 22))
Stamp Duties Act 1782 (repealed)	22 Geo. 3. c. 33	30 May 1782
An Act for charging a Stamp Duty upon Inland Bills of Exchange, Promissory Notes, or other Notes payable otherwise than upon Demand. (Repealed by Statute Law Revision Act 1861 (24 & 25 Vict. c. 101))
National Debt (No. 2) Act 1782 (repealed)	22 Geo. 3. c. 34	30 May 1782
An Act for raising a certain Sum of Money by Loans or Exchequer Bills, for the Service of the Year One thousand seven hundred and eighty-two; and for consolidating certain Annuities, which were made one joint Stock by an Act made in the Thirty-first Year of the Reign of His late Majesty King George the Second, (Note: Pension Duties Act 1757 (31 Geo. 2. c. 22)) with certain Annuities, consolidated by several Acts made in the Twenty-fifth, (Note: National Debt (No. 2) Act 1751 (25 Geo. 2. c. 27)) Twenty-eighth, (Note: Supply, etc. Act 1755 (28 Geo. 2. c. 22)) Twenty-ninth, (Note: National Debt Act 1756 (29 Geo. 2. c. 7)) Thirty-first, Thirty-second (Note: National Debt (No. 2) Act 1758 (32 Geo. 2. c. 22)) and Thirty-third (Note: National Debt Act 1759 (33 Geo. 2. c. 12)) Years of the Reign of His said late Majesty, and several subsequent Acts. (Repealed by Statute Law Revision Act 1870 (33 & 34 Vict. c. 69))
Wapping, Stepney (Poor Relief) Act 1782 (repealed)	22 Geo. 3. c. 35	3 May 1782
An Act for the better Relief and Employment of the Poor of the Parish of Saint John of Wapping, in the County of Middlesex, and for providing a proper Workhouse and Burial Ground for the Use of the said Parish, and for opening certain Communications, and making certain Streets within the said Parish. (Repealed by London Government (Borough of Stepney) Order in Council 1901 (SR&O 1901/276))
Loans or Exchequer Bills Act 1782 (repealed)	22 Geo. 3. c. 36	19 June 1782
An Act for raising a further Sum of Money by Loans or Exchequer Bills for the Service of the Year One thousand seven hundred and eighty-two. (Repealed by Statute Law Revision Act 1871 (34 & 35 Vict. c. 116))
Salop (Small Debts) Act 1782 (repealed)	22 Geo. 3. c. 37	17 May 1782
An Act for the more easy and speedy Recovery of Small Debts within the Parishes of Broseley, Benthall, Madeley, Barrow, Linley, Willey, Little Wenlock and Dawley, and an Extra-parochial Place called Posnall, in the County of Salop. (Repealed by County Courts Act 1846 (9 & 10 Vict. c. 95))
Importation (No. 3) Act 1782 (repealed)	22 Geo. 3. c. 38	19 June 1782
An Act to permit the Importation of British Plantation Tobacco from any Port or Place, either in America or the West Indies, or in Europe, during the present Hostilities. (Repealed by Statute Law Revision Act 1871 (34 & 35 Vict. c. 116))
Salt Duties Act 1782 (repealed)	22 Geo. 3. c. 39	19 June 1782
An Act for granting to His Majesty additional Duties upon Salt, and certain Duties upon Glauber or Epsom Salts, and also on Mineral Alkali or Flux for Glass, made from Salt, and to prevent Frauds in the Duties on Foul Salt, to be used in manuring of Lands. (Repealed by Statute Law Revision Act 1861 (24 & 25 Vict. c. 101))
Criminal Law Act 1782 (repealed)	22 Geo. 3. c. 40	19 June 1782
An Act for punishing Persons wilfully and maliciously destroying any Woollen, Silk, Linen, or Cotton Goods, or any Implements prepared for or used in the Manufacture thereof; and for repealing so much of Two Acts made in the Twelfth Year of King George the First, (Note: Woollen Manufactures Act 1725 (12 Geo. 1. c. 34)) and in the Sixth Year of His present Majesty, (Note: Importation, etc. Act 1766 (6 Geo. 3. c. 28)) as relates to the Punishment of Persons destroying any Woollen or Silk Manufactures, or any Implements prepared for, or used therein. (Repealed by Capital Punishments, etc. Act 1823 (4 Geo. 4. c. 46))
Parliament Act 1782 or Crewe's Act (repealed)	22 Geo. 3. c. 41	19 June 1782
An Act for better securing the Freedom of Elections of Members to serve in Parliament, by disabling certain Officers employed in the Collection or Management of His Majesty's Revenues from giving their Votes at such Elections. (Repealed by Revenue Officers' Disabilities Act 1868 (31 & 32 Vict. c. 73))
Kew Bridge (Building and Tolls) Act 1782 (repealed)	22 Geo. 3. c. 42	17 May 1782
An Act for building a Stone Bridge cross the River of Thames, from the Parish of Ealing, in the County of Middlesex, to the opposite Shore in the Hamlet of Kew, in the County of Surrey. (Repealed by Statute Law Revision Act 1948 (11 & 12 Geo. 6. c. 62))
Spitalfields (Improvement) Act 1782 (repealed)	22 Geo. 3. c. 43	17 May 1782
An Act for making a Passage for Carriages from Spitalfields to Bishopsgate Street, in the County of Middlesex, and for paving the same; and for appropriating to those Purposes the Money arisen by virtue of an Act passed in the Eighteenth Year of His present Majesty, (Note: Spitalfields (Streets) Act 1778 (18 Geo. 3. c. 78)) for applying the Sum of Nine thousand Pounds to arise out of the Orphans Fund for making such Passage. (Repealed by Statute Law (Repeals) Act 2013 (c. 2))
Westminster (Streets) Act 1782 (repealed)	22 Geo. 3. c. 44	17 May 1782
An Act for amending the Pavement in, and for lighting some of the Streets, Lanes, Ways and Places, in the Parishes of Saint Margaret and Saint John the Evangelist, in Westminster, which are at present excluded from the Provisions of an Act, passed in the Eleventh Year of His present Majesty, intituled, "An Act to amend and render more effectual several Acts made relating to paving, cleansing and lighting the Squares, Streets, Lanes and other Places within the City and Liberty of Westminster, and Parts adjacent;" (Note: Westminster (Streets) Act 1771 (11 Geo. 3. c. 22)) and for preventing Nuisances and Annoyances in or near the same; and for making an Opening from Orchard Street, and widening some Part of Wood Street, and of Little Peter Street. (Repealed by Tothill Fields Improvement Act 1825 (6 Geo. 4. c. cxxxiv) and London Government (City of Westminster) Order in Council 1901 (SR&O 1901/278))
House of Commons (Disqualification) Act 1782 (repealed)	22 Geo. 3. c. 45	19 June 1782
An Act for restraining any Person concerned in any Contract, Commission, or Agreement made for the Publick Service from being elected, or sitting and voting as a Member of the House of Commons. (Repealed by House of Commons Disqualification Act 1957 (5 & 6 Eliz. 2. c. 20))
Truce with America Act 1782 (repealed)	22 Geo. 3. c. 46	19 June 1782
An Act to enable His Majesty to conclude a Peace or Truce with certain Colonies in North America, therein mentioned. (Repealed by Statute Law Revision Act 1871 (34 & 35 Vict. c. 116))
Lottery Office Keepers Act 1782 (repealed)	22 Geo. 3. c. 47	19 June 1782
An Act for licensing Lottery Office Keepers, and regulating the Sale of Lottery Tickets. (Repealed by Lotteries Act 1802 (42 Geo. 3. c. 54))
Fire Insurance Duty Act 1782 (repealed)	22 Geo. 3. c. 48	19 June 1782
An Act for charging a Duty on Persons whose Property shall be insured against Loss by Fire. (Repealed by Revenue Act 1869 (32 & 33 Vict. c. 14))
Customs (No. 4) Act 1782 (repealed)	22 Geo. 3. c. 49	19 June 1782
An Act to rectify a Mistake in an Act of this Session of Parliament, (Note: Customs (No. 2) Act 1782 (22 Geo. 3. c. 21)) with respect to preventing the Importation and running of Tea into this Kingdom in armed Vessels, having Letters of Marque, or other Commissions from the Admiralty. (Repealed by Statute Law Revision Act 1861 (24 & 25 Vict. c. 101))
Audit of Public Accounts Act 1782 (repealed)	22 Geo. 3. c. 50	19 June 1782
An Act for further continuing an Act made in the Twentieth Year of the Reign of His present Majesty, intituled, "An Act for appointing and enabling Commissioners to examine, take, and state the Public Accounts of the Kingdom, and to report what Balances are in the Hands of Accountants, which may be applied to the Public Service, and what Defects there are in the present Mode of receiving, collecting, issuing, and accounting for Public Money, and in what more expeditious and effectual and less expensive Manner, the said Services can in future be regulated and carried on for the Benefit of the Public." (Note: Audit of Public Accounts Act 1780 (20 Geo. 3. c. 54)) (Repealed by Statute Law Revision Act 1871 (34 & 35 Vict. c. 116))
East India Company Act 1782 (repealed)	22 Geo. 3. c. 51	19 June 1782
An Act to discharge and indemnify the United Company of Merchants of England trading to the East Indies from all Damage, Interests and Losses in respect to their having made Default in certain Payments due to the Public, on such Payments being made at a future stipulated Time; and to enable the said Company to continue a Dividend of Eight Pounds per Centum to the Proprietors of their Stock for the present Year. (Repealed by Statute Law Revision Act 1871 (34 & 35 Vict. c. 116))
Edinburgh (Slaughter of Animals) Act 1782 (repealed)	22 Geo. 3. c. 52	19 June 1782
An Act for preventing the slaughtering of Cattle within the City of Edinburgh, and for removing Nuisances and Annoyances therefrom. (Repealed by Statute Law Revision Act 1948 (11 & 12 Geo. 6. c. 62))
Repeal of Act for Securing Dependence of Ireland Act 1782 (repealed)	22 Geo. 3. c. 53	21 June 1782
An Act to repeal an Act made in the Sixth Year of the Reign of His late Majesty King George the First, intituled, "An Act for the better securing the Dependency of the Kingdom of Ireland upon the Crown of Great Britain." (Note: Dependency of Ireland on Great Britain Act 1719 (6 Geo. 1. c. 5)) (Repealed by Statute Law Revision Act 1871 (34 & 35 Vict. c. 116))
Sir Thomas Rumbold and another Act 1782 (repealed)	22 Geo. 3. c. 54	19 June 1782
An Act for restraining Sir Thomas Rumbold Baronet, and Peter Perring Esquire, from going out of this Kingdom for a limited Time, and for discovering their Estates and Effects, and preventing the transporting or alienating the same. (Repealed by Statute Law Revision Act 1871 (34 & 35 Vict. c. 116))
Indemnity Act 1782 (repealed)	22 Geo. 3. c. 55	19 June 1782
An Act to indemnify such Persons as have omitted to qualify themselves for Offices and Employments, and to indemnify Justices of the Peace, or others who have omitted to register or deliver in their Qualifications within the Time limited by Law, and for giving further Time for those Purposes; and to indemnify Members and Officers in Cities, Corporations, and Borough Towns, whose Admissions have been omitted to be stamped according to Law, or having been stamped have been lost or mislaid, and for allowing them Time to provide Admissions duly stamped, and to give further Time to such Persons as have omitted to make and file Affidavits of the Execution of Indentures of Clerks to Attornies and Solicitors. (Repealed by Promissory Oaths Act 1871 (34 & 35 Vict. c. 48))
Saint Luke (Finsbury), Middlesex (Poor Relief etc.) Act 1782 (repealed)	22 Geo. 3. c. 56	19 June 1782
An Act more effectually to enable the Inhabitants of the Parish of Saint Luke, in the County of Middlesex, to purchase, hire, or erect a Workhouse, within or near the said Parish, for the better Reception and Employment of the Poor of the said Parish. (Repealed by St. Luke, Middlesex, Poor Relief Act 1808 (48 Geo. 3. c. xcvii) and London County Council (General Powers) Act 1932 (22 & 23 Geo. 5. c. lxx))
Lancaster Bridge Act 1782 (repealed)	22 Geo. 3. c. 57	19 June 1782
An Act for building a new Bridge instead of the present antient Bridge, commonly called Lancaster Bridge, at a more convenient Place over the River Loyne, near the Town of Lancaster, in the County Palatine of Lancaster. (Repealed by County of Lancashire Act 1984 (c. xxi))
Criminal Law (No. 2) Act 1782 (repealed)	22 Geo. 3. c. 58	1 July 1782
An Act for the more easy Discovery and effectual Punishment of Buyers and Receivers of Stolen Goods. (Repealed by Statute Law Revision Act 1861 (24 & 25 Vict. c. 101))
Sir Thomas Rumbold and another (No. 2) Act 1782 (repealed)	22 Geo. 3. c. 59	1 July 1782
An Act to provide that the Proceedings on the Bill now depending in Parliament, for inflicting certain Pains and Penalties on Sir Thomas Rumbold Baronet, and Peter Perring Esquire, for certain Breaches of Public Trust and High Crimes and Misdemeanors committed by them whilst they respectively held the Offices of Governor and President, Counsellors and Members of the Select Committee of the Settlement of Fort Saint George, on the Coast of Coromandel in the East Indies, shall not be discontinued by any Prorogation or Dissolution of the Parliament. (Repealed by Statute Law Revision Act 1871 (34 & 35 Vict. c. 116))
Seducing Certain Artificers to go Beyond Sea, etc. Act 1782 (repealed)	22 Geo. 3. c. 60	1 July 1782
An Act to prevent the seducing of Artificers or Workmen employed in printing Callicoes, Cottons, Muslins and Linens, or in making or preparing Blocks, Plates, or other Implements used in that Manufactory, to go to Parts beyond the Seas, and to prohibit the exporting to Foreign Parts of any such Blocks, Plates, or other Implements. (Repealed by Artificers Going Abroad Act 1824 (5 Geo. 4. c. 97) (Note: Incorrectly cited as "5 Geo. 4. c. 79" in the Chronological Table of the Statutes.) and Customs Law Repeal Act 1825 (6 Geo. 4. c. 105))
Customs (No. 5) Act 1782 (repealed)	22 Geo. 3. c. 61	1 July 1782
An Act for granting an additional Duty upon White or manufactured Bees Wax imported into Great Britain. (Repealed by Statute Law Revision Act 1861 (24 & 25 Vict. c. 101))
Militia (No. 2) Act 1782 (repealed)	22 Geo. 3. c. 62	1 July 1782
An Act to explain and amend so much of an Act made in the Second Year of the Reign of His present Majesty, (Note: Militia Act 1762 (2 Geo. 3. c. 20)) for raising and training the Militia, as relates to Persons paying the Sum of Ten Pounds, being liable to serve again in the Militia at the Expiration of Three Years, and also to oblige Substitutes to make Oath respecting their Place of Settlement. (Repealed by Statute Law Revision Act 1861 (24 & 25 Vict. c. 101))
Use of Highland Dress Act 1782 or the Dress Act 1746 (repealed)	22 Geo. 3. c. 63	1 July 1782
An Act to repeal so much of an Act made in the Nineteenth Year of King George the Second, (Note: Disarming the Highlands, etc. Act 1745 (19 Geo. 2. c. 39)) (for the more effectual disarming the Highlands in Scotland, and for the other Purposes therein mentioned,) as restrains the Use of the Highland Dress. (Repealed by Statute Law Revision Act 1871 (34 & 35 Vict. c. 116))
Houses of Correction Act 1782 (repealed)	22 Geo. 3. c. 64	1 July 1782
An Act for the amending and rendering more effectual the Laws in being relative to Houses of Correction. (Repealed by Statute Law Revision Act 1861 (24 & 25 Vict. c. 101))
Strand, London (Improvement) Act 1782 (repealed)	22 Geo. 3. c. 65	1 July 1782
An Act to enable the Most Noble Henry Duke of Newcastle, his Heirs, Executors or Administrators, to open a Street from the Strand, at or near the East End of the New Church, to the South End of Stanhope Street, in the Parish of Saint Clement Danes, within the City and Liberty of Westminster; and to make a more commodious Communication between the North End of Stanhope Street aforesaid, and Wylde Street, in the Parish of Saint Giles in the Fields, in the County of Middlesex. (Repealed by Statute Law Revision Act 1948 (11 & 12 Geo. 6. c. 62))
Customs and Excise Act 1782 (repealed)	22 Geo. 3. c. 66	5 July 1782
An Act for granting to His Majesty additional Duties upon the Produce of the several Duties under the Management of the respective Commissioners of the Customs and Excise in Great Britain. (Repealed by Statute Law Revision Act 1861 (24 & 25 Vict. c. 101))
Appropriation Act 1782 (repealed)	22 Geo. 3. c. 67	5 July 1782
An Act for granting to His Majesty a certain Sum of Money out of the Sinking Fund; and for applying certain Monies therein mentioned, for the Service of the Year One thousand seven hundred and eighty two; and for further appropriating the Supplies granted in this Session of Parliament. (Repealed by Statute Law Revision Act 1871 (34 & 35 Vict. c. 116))
Taxation Act 1782 (repealed)	22 Geo. 3. c. 68	5 July 1782
An Act for repealing the Duties payable for Beer and Ale above Six Shillings the Barrel, exclusive of the Duties of Excise, and not exceeding Eleven Shillings the Barrel, exclusive of such Duties, and for granting other Duties in lieu thereof; for granting additional Duties on Coaches and other Carriages therein mentioned; and also additional Duties on Sope made in Great Britain, and upon the Produce of the said additional Duties on Coaches and on other Carriages; and for the better securing the Duty upon Tea, and other Duties of Excise; and also for appointing the Number of Commissioners of Excise who may hear Causes depending before them relative to the Duties on Male Servants. (Repealed by Statute Law Revision Act 1861 (24 & 25 Vict. c. 101))
John Whitehill, Esquire Act 1782 (repealed)	22 Geo. 3. c. 69	1 July 1782
An Act for compelling John Whitehill Esquire to return into this Kingdom; and for restraining him, in case of his Return, from going out of this Kingdom for a limited Time; and for discovering his Estate and Effects, and preventing the transporting or alienating of the same. (Repealed by John Whitehill, Esquire Act 1783 (23 Geo. 3. c. 19))
Postage Act 1782 (repealed)	22 Geo. 3. c. 70	5 July 1782
An Act to enable the Commander in Chief of His Majesty's Forces, and the Secretary to the Commander in Chief of His Majesty's Forces, to send and receive Letters and Packets free from the Duty of Postage. (Repealed by Post Office (Repeal of Laws) Act 1837 (7 Will. 4 & 1 Vict. c. 32))
Supply of Ships to Enemies Act 1782 (repealed)	22 Geo. 3. c. 71	5 July 1782
An Act more effectually to prevent His Majesty's Enemies from being supplied with Ships or Vessels from Great Britain. (Repealed by Statute Law Revision Act 1871 (34 & 35 Vict. c. 116))
Importation Act (No. 4) 1782 (repealed)	22 Geo. 3. c. 72	5 July 1782
An Act for continuing so much of an Act of the Sixth Year of His present Majesty (Note: Importation, etc. Act 1766 (6 Geo. 3. c. 28)) as relates to prohibiting the Importation of Foreign wrought Silks and Velvets. (Repealed by Statute Law Revision Act 1871 (34 & 35 Vict. c. 116))
Tobacco Act 1782 (repealed)	22 Geo. 3. c. 73	5 July 1782
An Act to explain an Act made in the Twelfth Year of the Reign of King Charles the Second, intituled, "An Act for prohibiting the planting, setting or sowing of Tobacco in England or Ireland;" (Note: Tobacco Planting and Sowing Act 1660 (12 Cha. 2. c. 34)) and to permit the Use and Removal of Tobacco the Growth of Scotland, into England, for a limited Time, under certain Restrictions. (Repealed by Finance (1909-10) Act 1910 (10 Edw. 7 & 1 Geo. 5. c. 8))
First Meetings of Commissioners etc. Act 1782 (repealed)	22 Geo. 3. c. 74	5 July 1782
An Act for enlarging the Times appointed for the First Meetings of Commissioners or other Persons for putting in Execution certain Acts of this Session of Parliament. (Repealed by Statute Law Revision Act 1871 (34 & 35 Vict. c. 116))
Colonial Leave of Absence Act 1782 or Burke's Act (repealed)	22 Geo. 3. c. 75	5 July 1782
An Act to prevent the granting in future any Patent Office, to be exercised in any Colony or Plantation now or at any Time hereafter belonging to the Crown of Great Britain, for any longer Term than during such Time as the Grantee thereof, or Person appointed thereto, shall discharge the Duty thereof in Person, and behave well therein. (Repealed by Statute Law Revision Act 1964 (c. 79))
Loans of Exchequer Bills Act 1782 (repealed)	22 Geo. 3. c. 76	5 July 1782
An Act for enabling His Majesty to raise the Sum of One Million for the Uses and Purposes therein mentioned. (Repealed by Statute Law Revision Act 1871 (34 & 35 Vict. c. 116))
London Hospitals Act 1782	22 Geo. 3. c. 77	5 July 1782
An Act to render valid and effectual certain Articles of Agreement between the Mayor and Commonalty and Citizens of the City of London, Governors of the Possessions, Revenues and Goods of the Hospitals of Edward King of England the Sixth, of Christ, Bridewell and Saint Thomas the Apostle, and of the Hospitals of Henry the Eighth, King of England, called, The House of the Poor in West Smithfield, near London, and of the House and Hospital called Bethelem, and the Presidents, Treasurers and acting Governors of the said several Hospitals.
Importation (No. 5) Act 1782 (repealed)	22 Geo. 3. c. 78	11 July 1782
An Act to permit Drugs, the Product of Hungary or Germany, to be imported from the Austrian Netherlands, or any Part of Germany, upon Payment of the Single Duty; to allow the Importation of Hungary or German Wines, and Organzined Thrown Silk, from the Austrian Netherlands, or any Part of Germany, into Great Britain, and of Timber and other Goods from any Part of Europe, in Ships the Property of Subjects under the same Sovereign as the Country of which the Goods are the Growth, Produce or Manufacture. (Repealed by Repeal of Acts Concerning Importation (No. 2) Act 1822 (3 Geo. 4. c. 42) and Customs Law Repeal Act 1825 (6 Geo. 4. c. 105))
Volunteers Act 1782 (repealed)	22 Geo. 3. c. 79	11 July 1782
An Act for the Encouragement and disciplining of such Corps or Companies of Men as shall voluntarily enroll themselves for Defence of their Towns or Coasts, or for the general Defence of the Kingdom, during the present War. (Repealed by Statute Law Revision Act 1871 (34 & 35 Vict. c. 116))
Portsmouth, Chatham Fortifications Act 1782	22 Geo. 3. c. 80	11 July 1782
An Act to vest certain Messuages, Lands, Tenements and Hereditaments in Trustees, for the better securing His Majesty's Docks, Ships and Stores, at Portsmouth and Chatham.
Paymaster General Act 1782 (repealed)	22 Geo. 3. c. 81	11 July 1782
An Act for the better Regulation of the Office of Paymaster General of His Majesty's Forces. (Repealed by Accounts of Paymaster General Act 1808 (48 Geo. 3. c. 49))
Civil List and Secret Service Money Act 1782 (repealed)	22 Geo. 3. c. 82	11 July 1782
An Act for enabling His Majesty to discharge the Debt contracted upon his Civil List Revenues, and for preventing the same from being in Arrear for the future, by regulating the Mode of Payments out of the said Revenues, and by suppressing or regulating certain Offices therein mentioned, which are now paid out of the Revenues of the Civil List. (Repealed by Statute Law (Repeals) Act 1993 (c. 50))
Relief of the Poor Act 1782 (repealed)	22 Geo. 3. c. 83	11 July 1782
An Act for the better Relief and Employment of the Poor. (Repealed by Statute Law Revision Act 1871 (34 & 35 Vict. c. 116))
London (Streets) Act 1782 (repealed)	22 Geo. 3. c. 84	1 July 1782
An Act for better paving, cleansing, and lighting Part of the Parish of Saint George, Hanover Square, in the County of Middlesex, and such Part of Old Bond Street as lies within the Parish of Saint James, in the said County; and for removing and preventing Nuisances and Annoyances therein. (Repealed by London Government (City of Westminster) Order in Council 1901 (SR&O 1901/278))
Portman Square (Improvement) Act 1782	22 Geo. 3. c. 85	1 July 1782
An Act for the Improvement of Portman Square, within the Parish of Saint Mary le Bonne, in the County of Middlesex.
Wapping, Stepney (Improvement) Act 1782 (repealed)	22 Geo. 3. c. 86	1 July 1782
An Act for explaining and amending Two Acts, one made in the Eleventh, (Note: Saint John, Wapping (Improvement) Act 1771 (11 Geo. 3. c. 21)) and the other in the Seventeenth (Note: London (Streets) Act 1776 (17 Geo. 3. c. 22)) Year of His present Majesty, for paving certain Streets in the Parishes of Saint John of Wapping, and Saint George, in the County of Middlesex, and for other Purposes; and for extending the Provisions of the said Acts to other Parts of the said Parishes; and also for opening certain Communications within the said Parish of Saint George. (Repealed by London Government (Borough of Stepney) Order in Council 1901 (SR&O 1901/276))
Limehouse, Stepney (Streets) Act 1782 (repealed)	22 Geo. 3. c. 87	11 July 1782
An Act for paving and freeing from Nuisances and Annoyances the several Streets, Ways and Places within the Parish of Saint Anne, in the County of Middlesex, and Queen Street and London Street, in the Hamlet of Ratcliffe, within the said Parish; and for making Ways or Streets into the Street called Risby's Rope Ground, and through or across Shoulder of Mutton Alley, and a Street called Ropemaker's Fields to Three Colt Street; and from the Bridge in the said Street called Risby's Rope Ground, into Three Colt Street aforesaid. (Repealed by London Government (Borough of Stepney) Order in Council 1901 (SR&O 1901/276))
Preston and Lancaster Road Act 1782 (repealed)	22 Geo. 3. c. 88	12 March 1782
An Act to continue the Term of an Act made in the Twenty-fourth Year of the Reign of His late Majesty King George the Second, (Note: Preston and Lancaster Road Act 1750 (24 Geo. 2. c. 20)) for repairing and widening the Road from Preston to Lancaster; and from thence to a Place called Heiring Syke, (Note: Heron Syke is a stream near the border between Lancaster and Burton-in-Kendal.) that divides the Counties of Lancaster and Westmorland. (Repealed by Road from Preston to Garstang Act 1823 (4 Geo. 4. c. xiii) and Road from Garstang to Lancaster and Heiring Syke Act 1823 (4 Geo. 4. c. xxiv))
Truro Roads Act 1782 (repealed)	22 Geo. 3. c. 89	12 March 1782
An Act for extending the Provisions of an Act made in the Thirteenth Year of His present Majesty, (Note: Truro Roads Act 1773 (13 Geo. 3. c. 112)) for more effectually amending several Roads leading from the Borough of Truro, in the County of Cornwall, to the Roads leading from Shortlanes End, in the Parish of Kenwyn, to Callestock Burrow; and from the Two Burrows, in the said Parish, to Perran Alms House; and from the Three Burrows, in the said Parish, to Saint Agnes Alms House, in the said County. (Repealed by Truro Roads Act 1817 (57 Geo. 3. c. xliv) and Truro Roads Act 1828 (9 Geo. 4. c. iii))
Holderness to Beverley Road Act 1782 (repealed)	22 Geo. 3. c. 90	12 March 1782
An Act for enlarging the Term and Powers of an Act passed in the First Year of the Reign of His present Majesty, (Note: White Cross and Beverley Roads Act 1760 (1 Geo. 3. c. 42)) for repairing and amending the Road leading from White Cross, in the Parish of Leven, in Holderness, in the East Riding of the County of York, to the Town of Beverley, in the same County. (Repealed by Whitecross and Beverley Road Act 1826 (7 Geo. 4. c. cxxvi))
Hertford Roads Act 1782 (repealed)	22 Geo. 3. c. 91	12 March 1782
An Act to confirm and carry into Execution certain Articles of Agreement entered into between the Right Honourable James Earl of Salisbury, and the Trustees appointed by and under several Acts of Parliament, for repairing the Road leading from Galley Corner, adjoining to Enfield Chace, in the Parish of South Mims, in the County of Middlesex, to Lemnsford Mill, in the County of Hertford; and for turning and altering the said Road in the Manner mentioned in the said Agreement. (Repealed by Hertford and Middlesex Roads Act 1791 (31 Geo. 3. c. 108))
Oakhampton Roads Act 1782 (repealed)	22 Geo. 3. c. 92	25 March 1782
An Act for continuing the Term and altering and enlarging the Powers of an Act made in the Thirty third Year of His late Majesty, (Note: Okehampton Roads Act 1759 (33 Geo. 2. c. 36)) for repairing several Roads leading to the Town of Oakhampton, in the County of Devon. (Repealed by Okehampton Roads Act 1823 (4 Geo. 4. c. civ))
Yorkshire and Durham Roads Act 1782 (repealed)	22 Geo. 3. c. 93	25 March 1782
An Act to continue and enlarge the Term and Powers of an Act made in the First Year of the Reign of His present Majesty, intituled, "An Act for amending and widening the Roads from the Turnpike Road upon Gatherley Moor, in the County of York, to Staindrop, in the County of Durham; and from the said Turnpike Road near Smallways, across the River Tees to Winston, in the said County of Durham; and for building a Bridge over the said River at or near Winston Ford." (Note: Yorkshire and Durham Roads Act 1760 (1 Geo. 3. c. 41)) (Repealed by Gatherley Moor and Staindrop, and Smallways and Winston Roads Act 1825 (6 Geo. 4. c. vii))
Lincoln and Nottinghamshire Roads Act 1782 (repealed)	22 Geo. 3. c. 94	25 March 1782
An Act for enlarging the Term and Powers of an Act made in the Thirty-second Year of the Reign of His late Majesty King George the Second, intituled, "An Act for repairing and widening the Roads from a Place called Littlegate, at the Top of Leadenham Hill, in the County of Lincoln, to the West End of Barnby Gate in Newark upon Trent; and from the Guide Post at the Division of Kelham and Muskham Lanes to Mansfield; and from Southwell to Oxton, in the County of Nottingham;" (Note: Lincoln and Notts Roads Act 1758 (32 Geo. 2. c. 57)) and for repairing the Road from the West Side of Newark Bridge to the said Guide Post. (Repealed by Roads from Littlegate, Newark-upon-Trent and Southwell Act 1826 (7 Geo. 4. c. xxiv))
Worcester Roads Act 1782 (repealed)	22 Geo. 3. c. 95	25 March 1782
An Act for continuing the Term and altering and enlarging the Powers of an Act of the Second Year of His present Majesty (Note: Worcester and Salop Roads Act 1762 (2 Geo. 3. c. 78)) for amending and widening the Road from the Market House in Stourbridge, to Colly Gate, in Cradley, and other Roads therein mentioned, in the Counties of Worcester, Stafford and Salop, so far as the same relates to the Roads leading from the Market House in Stourbridge to Colly Gate, and from Pedmore to Holly Hall, and from Colly Gate to Halesowen; and for opening a more commodious Communication with the Birmingham Turnpike Road. (Repealed by Pedmore and Rowley Road Act 1852 (15 & 16 Vict. c. lxxxvi))
Stafford, Worcester and Warwick Roads Act 1782 (repealed)	22 Geo. 3. c. 96	25 March 1782
An Act for continuing the Term and altering and enlarging the Powers of an Act of the First Year of His present Majesty, (Note: Stafford, Worcester and Warwick Roads Act 1760 (1 Geo. 3. c. 39)) for amending and widening the Road from the Town of Stone, to Wordsley Green Gate; and from the West End of Bilston Street, in Wolverhampton, to the High Street opposite the Old Bush, in Dudley; and from a Place called Burnt Tree, near Dudley, to Birmingham; and from the Market Cross in Wolverhampton, to Cannock, in the Counties of Stafford, Worcester and Warwick. (Repealed by Stone, Stafford and Penkridge Turnpike Road Act 1824 (5 Geo. 4. c. lix) and Dudley, Birmingham, Wolverhampton and Streetway District Roads Act 1829 (10 Geo. 4. c. lxxix))
Yorkshire Roads Act 1782 (repealed)	22 Geo. 3. c. 97	25 March 1782
An Act for enlarging the Term and Powers of an Act made in the Thirty-third Year of the Reign of His Majesty King George the Second, intituled, "An Act for amending and widening the Road from Bawtry to Sheffield, and from Sheffield to the South Side of Wortley, in the County of York, where it joins the Turnpike Road leading from Rotherham to Manchester," (Note: Yorkshire Roads Act 1759 (33 Geo. 2. c. 55)) so far as the same relates to the Road leading from Bawtry aforesaid to Tinsley; and through Part of the Town of Tinsley, to the Place where the same joins the Road leading from Rotherham to Sheffield. (Repealed by Bawtry and Tinsley Turnpike Road Act 1825 (6 Geo. 4. c. xc))
Kent Roads Act 1782 (repealed)	22 Geo. 3. c. 98	25 March 1782
An Act for continuing the Term and altering the Powers of an Act of the First Year of His present Majesty, (Note: Dartford and Strood Roads Act 1760 (1 Geo. 3. c. 40)) for amending the Road from Dartford to Northfleet, and other Roads therein mentioned, in the County of Kent; and for allowing an annual Payment out of the Tolls arising upon the said Roads to the Trustees for the Care of the Road leading from Rochester to Maidstone, in the said County, to be applied for the Purposes therein mentioned. (Repealed by Road from Dartford to Strood Act 1822 (3 Geo. 4. c. lxx))
Tamworth Roads Act 1782 (repealed)	22 Geo. 3. c. 99	25 March 1782
An Act for enlarging the Term and Powers of an Act of the Tenth Year of His present Majesty, intituled, "An Act for repairing and widening several Roads leading to and through the Borough of Tamworth, and other Roads therein mentioned, in the Counties of Stafford, Warwick and Derby." (Note: Tamworth Roads Act 1770 (10 Geo. 3. c. 99)) (Repealed by Tamworth Roads Act 1832 (2 & 3 Will. 4. c. li))
Hereford and Worcester Roads Act 1782 (repealed)	22 Geo. 3. c. 100	3 May 1782
An Act for amending and keeping in Repair the Road leading from the Willersley Turnpike Road near Parton to Monkland Mill, and from the Turnpike Road on Fair Mile Field, to the Turnpike Road at Broad Heath, and from the Turnpike Road at or near the Ford's Bridge to the Turnpike Road near Stockton, and from Kyre Common to the Turnpike Road at Grendon Green, in the Counties of Hereford and Worcester. (Repealed by Parton and Monkland Mill Road (Herefordshire and Worcestershire) Act 1826 (7 Geo. 4. c. cxxxv))
Dorset Roads Act 1782 (repealed)	22 Geo. 3. c. 101	3 May 1782
An Act to enlarge the Term and Powers of an Act made in the First Year of the Reign of His present Majesty, (Note: Dorset Roads Act 1760 (1 Geo. 3. c. 24)) for repairing and widening several Roads leading to and through the Towns of Weymouth and Melcombe Regis, and Dorchester, in the County of Dorset; and for repairing the Road leading from the Parish of Warmwell, through the Parishes of Poxwell and Osmington to the Church in the said Parish of Osmington, in the said County of Dorset. (Repealed by Weymouth, Melcombe Regis and Dorchester Roads Act 1825 (6 Geo. 4. c. c))
Kent Roads (No. 2) Act 1782 (repealed)	22 Geo. 3. c. 102	3 May 1782
An Act for continuing the Term of an Act made in the Second Year of the Reign of His present Majesty, (Note: Kent Roads (No. 2) Act 1762 (2 Geo. 3. c. 76)) for amending and widening the Road leading from the High Post Road near the Town of Faversham, by Bacon's Water, through Ashford, to the Town and Port of Hythe, in the County of Kent, and from Bacon's Water to a certain Lane called Holy Lane, in Wincheap, near the City of Canterbury. (Repealed by Faversham, Hythe and Canterbury Roads Act 1824 (5 Geo. 4. c. lxii))
Tenbury Roads Act 1782 (repealed)	22 Geo. 3. c. 103	3 May 1782
An Act for reviving and continuing the Term, and enlarging the Powers of an Act of the Thirtieth Year of His late Majesty, intituled, "An Act for amending, widening, and keeping in Repair several Roads in and near to the Town of Tenbury, in the Counties of Salop, Worcester, and Hereford;" (Note: Tenbury Roads Act 1757 (30 Geo. 2. c. 38)) and for amending and keeping in Repair the Roads leading from the Knowle Gate to the Turnpike Road on the Clee Hill, leading from Ludlow to Cleobury Mortimer, and from Kyre Mill to the Turnpike Road leading from Bromyard to Tenbury, in the said Counties. (Repealed by Tenbury and Hereford Roads Act 1823 (4 Geo. 4. c. xxv))
Cornwall Roads Act 1782 (repealed)	22 Geo. 3. c. 104	3 May 1782
An Act to continue and enlarge the Term and Powers of an Act made in the Thirty-third Year of the Reign of His late Majesty King George the Second, (Note: Cornwall Roads Act 1759 (33 Geo. 2. c. 42)) for repairing and widening the Roads from Haleworthy, in the Parish of Davidstow, in the County of Cornwall, to the East End of Wadebridge, in the said County; and from the West End of Wadebridge aforesaid, into and through the Borough of Mitchell, in the said County. (Repealed by Road from Haleworthy to Wadebridge (Cornwall) Act 1825 (6 Geo. 4. c. xl))
Wrexham to Barnhill Road Act 1782 (repealed)	22 Geo. 3. c. 105	17 May 1782
An Act for amending, widening and keeping in Repair the Road from Wrexham, in the County of Denbigh, to Barnhill, in the County of Chester. (Repealed by Wrexham and Barnhill Road and Branch Act 1823 (4 Geo. 4. c. xlv) (Note: Incorrectly cited as "4 Geo. 4. c. lxv" in the Chronological Table of the Statutes.))
Tarporley to Weverham Road Act 1782 (repealed)	22 Geo. 3. c. 106	17 May 1782
An Act for repairing and widening the Road from Tarporley, in the County Palatine of Chester, to Acton Bridge, near Weverham, in the same County. (Repealed by Tarporley and Weverham Road (Cheshire) Act 1823 (4 Geo. 4. c. lxxxii))
Derby and Chester Roads Act 1782 (repealed)	22 Geo. 3. c. 107	17 May 1782
An Act for enlarging the Term and Powers of so much of an Act, made in the Second Year of the Reign of His present Majesty, intituled, "An Act for repairing and widening the High Road leading from Ashborne, in the County of Derby, to the Town of Leek, in the County of Stafford, and from Ryecrost Gate upon Rushton Common, to Congleton, in the County of Chester; and also the Road leading from Blyth Marsh, in the County of Stafford, through Cheadle, Oakamoor and Blore, to the Turnpike Road from Ashborne to Buxton near Thorp, in the County of Derby," (Note: Stafford, Chester and Derby Roads Act 1762 (2 Geo. 3. c. 62)) as relates to the District of Road between Ashborne and Congleton; and for repairing the Road from the End of Ashborne Church Yard, to the Top of the Dig Street, in Ashborne aforesaid." (Repealed by Ashbourne and Leek, and Rushton Common and Congleton Roads Act 1826 (7 Geo. 4. c. lxxix))
Hereford Roads Act 1782 (repealed)	22 Geo. 3. c. 108	17 May 1782
An Act to enlarge the Term and Powers of an Act, passed in the Thirty-third Year of the Reign of King George the Second, (Note: Hereford Roads, etc. Act 1759 (33 Geo. 2. c. 58)) for repairing the Roads from the Town of Brecon to the Parish of Brobury, and to Whitney Passage, in the County of Hereford, and for building a Bridge over the River Wye at Bredwardine Passage, in the same County, so far as relates to such of the Roads comprized in the said Act as lie in the County of Hereford. (Repealed by Whitney Bridge and Bredwardine Bridge and Hay Roads Act 1822 (3 Geo. 4. c. lxxxvii))
Wey Hill to Lyde Way Road Act 1782 (repealed)	22 Geo. 3. c. 109	17 May 1782
An Act to enlarge the Term and Powers of an Act, passed in the Second Year of His present Majesty, (Note: Weyhill and Lyde Way Road Act 1762 (2 Geo. 3. c. 60)) for repairing and widening the Road from the Turnpike Road at Wey Hill, in the County of Southampton, to the Turnpike Road at Lyde Way, in the County of Wilts. (Repealed by Weyhill and Lydeway Road Act 1820 (1 Geo. 4. c. xxiv) and Annual Turnpike Acts Continuance Act 1873 (36 & 37 Vict. c. 90))
Wiltshire and Southampton Roads Act 1782 (repealed)	22 Geo. 3. c. 110	17 May 1782
An Act to continue the Term, and alter the Powers of an Act, made in the Twenty-ninth Year of the Reign of His late Majesty King George the Second, intituled, "An Act for repairing and widening the Roads leading from a Pond belonging to Henry Eyre Esquire, in the Parish of White Parish, in the County of Wilts, to the Top of Dunwood Hill, and from thence over Great Bridge and Middle Bridge, through Romsey-infra to Hundred Bridge, in the County of Southampton, and from thence to the County of the Town of Southampton." (Note: Wiltshire and Southampton Roads Act 1756 (29 Geo. 2. c. 45)) (Repealed by Whiteparish, Romsey and Southampton Turnpike Roads Act 1824 (5 Geo. 4. c. lxxxiii))
Westmorland Roads Act 1782 (repealed)	22 Geo. 3. c. 111	17 May 1782
An Act for enlarging the Term and Powers of an Act, made in the First Year of the Reign of His present Majesty, intituled, "An Act for repairing and widening the Road from the Borough of Appleby, in the County of Westmorland, through the Township of Orton to Kirby Kendall, and from Orton to the Turnpike Road near Shapp, and from Highgate near Tebay, in a Part of the Highway between Appleby and Kirby Kendall, through the Town of Kirby Steven, to the Town of Market Brough, in the said County." (Note: Westmorland Roads Act 1760 (1 Geo. 3. c. 43)) (Repealed by Appleby and Kendal and other roads in Westmorland Act 1824 (5 Geo. 4. c. xv))
Hereford Roads Act 1782 (repealed)	22 Geo. 3. c. 112	19 June 1782
An Act for repairing and widening the Roads from a Place called The Hardwicke, in the Parish of Clifford, to Windmill Hill, and from Dewchurch to Pontrilas, in the County of Hereford. (Repealed by Statute Law (Repeals) Act 1998 (c. 43))
Radnor Roads Act 1782 (repealed)	22 Geo. 3. c. 113	19 June 1782
An Act for repairing and widening the Road from the Town of Brecon, through the Town of Hay, in the County of Brecon, and also the Road through Marish Lane, to the Builth and Hay Turnpike Road, near the Village of Llyswen, in the same County. (Repealed by Roads in Brecon, Radnor and Glamorgan Act 1809 (49 Geo. 3. c. xiv))
Sussex Roads Act 1782 (repealed)	22 Geo. 3. c. 114	1 July 1782
An Act to repeal so much of an Act passed in the Second Year of the Reign of His present Majesty, (Note: Sussex and Kent Roads Act 1762 (2 Geo. 3. c. 72)) for repairing and widening the Road from Flimwell Vent, in the County of Sussex, through Highgate, in the County of Kent, and the Parishes of Sandhurst, Newenden, and Northiam, to Rye, in the said County of Sussex, and from Highgate aforesaid, to Cooper's Corner, in the said County of Sussex, and to Tubb's Lake, in the said County of Kent, as relates to the Road from Highgate to Tubb's Lake; and for enlarging the Term and Powers of the said Act, with respect to the other Roads therein contained. (Repealed by Sussex Roads Act 1825 (6 Geo. 4. c. xliii))
Shoreditch to Stamford Hill Road Act 1782 (repealed)	22 Geo. 3. c. 115	1 July 1782
An Act to enlarge the Term and Powers of several Acts passed in the Eleventh, (Note: Shoreditch to Stamford Hill Road Act 1737 (11 Geo. 2. c. 39)) Twenty-sixth, (Note: Shoreditch Road Act 1753 (26 Geo. 2. c. 55)) and Twenty-ninth (Note: Shoreditch to Stamford Hill Road Act 1756 (29 Geo. 2. c. 41)) Years of the Reign of His Majesty King George the Second, for repairing the Roads from Shoreditch Church, through Hackney to Stanford Hill, and cross Cambridge Heath over Bethnal Green, to the Turnpike at Mile End, in the County of Middlesex. (Repealed by Road from Shoreditch Church through Hackney Act 1821 (1 & 2 Geo. 4. c. cxii))
Stafford and Derby Roads Act 1782 (repealed)	22 Geo. 3. c. 116	11 July 1782
An Act to enlarge the Term and Powers of Two Acts, passed in the Second and Eleventh (Note: Staffordshire Roads (No. 2) Act 1771 (11 Geo. 3. c. 87)) Years of His present Majesty's Reign, so far as the same relate to the Road from Blyth Marsh to the Road leading from Ashborne to Buxton near Thorp, and from the Road between Cheadle and Leek to the Turnpike Road above Frogall Bridge, and from the same Road to the Road at or near Ruehill Gate, in the Counties of Stafford and Derby. (Repealed by Roads from Blyth Marsh and from Cheadle Act 1810 (50 Geo. 3. c. ciii) and Roads in the Neighbourhood of Cheadle Act 1831 (1 Will. 4. c. lxviii))

=== Private acts ===
Short title	Citation	Royal assent
Long title
Meier's and Retberg's Naturalization Act 1782	22 Geo. 3. c. 1 Pr.	20 December 1781
An Act for naturalizing Henry Meier and Herman Diederick Retberg.
Barrow's Estate Act 1782	22 Geo. 3. c. 2 Pr.	12 March 1782
An Act for allotting Part of Minsterworth Ham, in the Parish of Minsterworth, in the County of Gloucester, to Charles Barrow Esquire, his Heirs and Assigns, in lieu of his Common Rights thereupon; and for allowing Exchanges within the said Parish.
Billet's Naturalization Act 1782	22 Geo. 3. c. 3 Pr.	12 March 1782
An Act for naturalizing John Claudius Billet.
Schmoll's Naturalization Act 1782	22 Geo. 3. c. 4 Pr.	12 March 1782
An Act for naturalizing Charles Frederick Schmoll.
Tshiffeli's Naturalization Act 1782	22 Geo. 3. c. 5 Pr.	25 March 1782
An Act for naturalizing Frederick Tschiffeli.
Shepton Mallet Inclosure Act 1782	22 Geo. 3. c. 6 Pr.	3 May 1782
An Act for dividing and enclosing a certain Part of the Forest of Mendip, and a Piece of Waste Land called Windsor's Hill, situate within the Parish of Shepton Mallet, in the County of Somerset.
Lord Monson's Estate Act 1782	22 Geo. 3. c. 7 Pr.	17 May 1782
An Act for vesting divers Manors, Lands and Hereditaments, in the County of Hertford, late the Estate of John Lord Monson deceased, in Trustees, to be sold and disposed of in and for the Payment of his Debts, and certain of the Legacies and Portions given by his Will and Codicil; and for other Purposes therein mentioned.
Honley Inclosure Act 1782	22 Geo. 3. c. 8 Pr.	17 May 1782
An Act for dividing, enclosing and improving the several Commons and Waste Grounds within the Manor of Honley, in the Parish of Almondbury, in the County of York; and for abolishing or settling certain other Rights or Claims within the said Manor.
Pitt's Agreement Act 1782	22 Geo. 3. c. 9 Pr.	30 May 1782
An Act for confirming and carrying into Execution certain Agreements entered into by John Pitt Esquire, Surveyor General of His Majesty's Woods and Forests, with Benjamin Planner and others, relating to certain Waste Lands, and other Lands in the Parish of Egham, in the County of Surrey; and for vesting the same in the said John Pitt, and his Heirs, in Trust, for His Majesty, His Heirs and Successors; and to effectuate the other Purposes therein mentioned.
Cholwich's Estate Act 1782	22 Geo. 3. c. 10 Pr.	30 May 1782
An Act for discharging Part of the Settled Estates of John Burridge Cholwich Esquire, in the County of Devon, from the Uses and Trusts of his Marriage Settlement; and for settling other Estates in the said County in lieu thereof.
Basset's Estate Act 1782	22 Geo. 3. c. 11 Pr.	30 May 1782
An Act for discharging the Manor of Imley, otherwise Evenley, and divers Messuages, Lands, Tenements and Hereditaments in Imley, otherwise Evenley aforesaid, and elsewhere in the County of Northampton, Part of the Estate of Sir Francis Basset of Tehidy Park, in the County of Cornwall, Baronet, from the Uses, Estates and Trusts declared concerning the same, in and by the last Will and Testament of Francis Basset late of Tehidy Park aforesaid Esquire deceased; and for settling another Manor, and other Lands and Hereditaments of greater Value in lieu thereof, to the like Uses.
Newton's Divorce Act 1782	22 Geo. 3. c. 12 Pr.	30 May 1782
An Act to dissolve the Marriage of John Newton Esquire, with Catharine Seymour his now Wife, and to enable him to marry again; and for other Purposes therein mentioned.
Countess of Oxford's Estate Act 1782	22 Geo. 3. c. 13 Pr.	19 June 1782
An Act for vesting the Freehold and Inheritance in Fee of Part of the Estates heretofore of the Right Honourable Henrietta Cavendish Holles, Countess of Oxford and Countess Mortimer, deceased, in Trustees, in Trust to sell and dispose of so much thereof, as may be sufficient to pay off and discharge the Debts, Legacies, and other remaining Incumbrances; affecting the Whole of the Estates, late of her the said Countess, which were devised by her Will, and for other Purposes therein mentioned.
Duke of Newcastle's Estate Act 1782	22 Geo. 3. c. 14 Pr.	19 June 1782
An Act for vesting in Trustees a competent Part of the settled Estates of the Most Noble Henry Duke of Newcastle, in the Parishes of Saint Clement Danes and Saint Giles in the Fields, for the Purpose of raising on Mortgage or otherwise, such Sums of Money as shall be found expedient to be raised, and applied for making and opening a new Street therein mentioned, from the East End of the New Church in the Strand, to the South End of Stanhope Street; and for defraying all necessary Costs, Charges and Expences attending the same.
Earl of Holderness' Estate Act 1782	22 Geo. 3. c. 15 Pr.	19 June 1782
An Act for vesting Part of the Estates of Robert late Earl of Holdernesse deceased, in the County of York, in Trustees, for a Term of Years, for raising and Payment of the Sum of Five thousand Pounds charged by the Will of the said Earl on his said Estates.
Ely Estates in Holborn Act 1782	22 Geo. 3. c. 16 Pr.	19 June 1782
An Act for Sale of an annual Fee Farm Rent of One hundred Pounds, payable to the See of Ely, out of certain Estates in and near Hatton Garden, in the County of Middlesex; and for applying the Money to arise from such Sale in Manner therein mentioned.
Newnham's Estate Act 1782	22 Geo. 3. c. 17 Pr.	19 June 1782
An Act for enabling the Trustees for Sale of Part of the settled Estates of John Newnham Esquire, in the Counties of Huntingdon, Middlesex, and Sussex, and in the Cities of London and Canterbury, to make an Indemnity to the Purchasers of certain Parts thereof, against the perpetual annual Sums or Payments to which such Parts are liable.
Winstone Inclosure Act 1782	22 Geo. 3. c. 18 Pr.	19 June 1782
An Act for dividing and enclosing the Open and Common Fields, Common Meadows, Pastures, and Commonable and Waste Lands, within the Manor and Parish of Winstone, in the County of Gloucester.
Kingston Deverill Inclosure Act 1782	22 Geo. 3. c. 19 Pr.	19 June 1782
An Act for dividing and allotting in severalty the Open and Common Fields and Downs, Common Meadows, Common Pastures, and Commonable Places, within the Parish of Kingston Deverill, in the County of Wilts.
Thormanby Carr Inclosure Act 1782	22 Geo. 3. c. 20 Pr.	19 June 1782
An Act for dividing and enclosing a Carr or Common called Thormanby Carr, within the Parish of Thormanby, in the North Riding of the County of York.
Bolam Inclosure Act 1782	22 Geo. 3. c. 21 Pr.	19 June 1782
An Act for dividing and enclosing certain Open Common Fields, Meadows, Pastures and other Commonable Lands and Grounds within the Township of Bolam, in the Parish of Gainford, in the County of Durham.
Calverton Inclosure Act 1782	22 Geo. 3. c. 22 Pr.	19 June 1782
An Act for dividing and enclosing the Open and Common Fields, Meadows, Pastures and other Commonable Lands and Grounds in the Manor of Calverton, with the West Side of Stoney Stratford, in the County of Buckingham.
Orton-on-the-Hill Inclosure Act 1782	22 Geo. 3. c. 23 Pr.	19 June 1782
An Act for dividing, allotting and enclosing the Open Fields, Meadows, Pastures, Commons and Commonable Places in the Parish of Orton on the Hill, in the County of Leicester, and the Lands within the Ring of the said Fields, reputed to belong formerly to the Abbey of Merevale.
Wookey Inclosure Act 1782	22 Geo. 3. c. 24 Pr.	19 June 1782
An Act for dividing, enclosing and allotting certain Moors, Commons or Waste Lands, lying and being within the Parish of Wookey, in the County of Somerset.
Creaton Inclosure Act 1782	22 Geo. 3. c. 25 Pr.	19 June 1782
An Act for dividing, allotting and enclosing the Open and Common Fields, Common Pastures, Common Meadows, and other Commonable Lands and Grounds of and within the Parish of Great Creaton, in the County of Northampton, and the Hamlet of Little Creaton, in the Parish of Spratton, in the said County.
Stanton St. Quintin Inclosure Act 1782	22 Geo. 3. c. 26 Pr.	19 June 1782
An Act for dividing and enclosing the Open Common Fields and Commonable Places within the Parish of Stanton Saint Quintin, in the County of Wilts.
Piddington and Hackleton Inclosure Act 1782	22 Geo. 3. c. 27 Pr.	19 June 1782
An Act for dividing, allotting and enclosing the Open and Common Fields, Common Pastures, Common Meadows and other Commonable Lands and Grounds of and within the Manors and Liberties of Piddington and Hackleton, in the Parish of Piddington, in the County of Northampton.
Eastington Inclosure Act 1782	22 Geo. 3. c. 28 Pr.	1 July 1782
An Act for dividing, allotting, and enclosing certain Open and Common Fields, Common Meadows, Common Pastures, and Common Downs, in the Hamlet or Tything of Eastington, otherwise Northleach Foreign, in the Manor of Eastington, and Parish of Northleach, in the County of Gloucester.
Newcastle-under-Lyme Inclosure and Poor Rates Act 1782 or the Newcastle under Lyme Inclosure Act 1782 (repealed)	22 Geo. 3. c. 29 Pr.	1 July 1782
An Act for enclosing and leasing a Piece of Waste Land, called The Marsh, within the Parish and Borough of Newcastle-under-Lyme, in the County of Stafford, and applying the Profits thereof in Aid of the Poor's Rates of the said Parish and Borough. (Repealed by Staffordshire Act 1983 (c. xviii))
Sandiacre Inclosure Act 1782	22 Geo. 3. c. 30 Pr.	1 July 1782
An Act for dividing, allotting and enclosing the Open Fields, Meadows, Pastures, Commons, and Commonable Places, within the Lordship or Liberty of Sandiacre, in the County of Derby.
Norwood Inclosure Act 1782	22 Geo. 3. c. 31 Pr.	1 July 1782
An Act for confirming a certain Piece of Ground, Part of the Common of Norwood, in the Parish of Batcombe, in the County of Somerset, to the Rector of the said Parish; and for vesting the same, together with an additional Piece of Ground, other Part of the said Common, in him and his Successors, in lieu of all Right of Common and Tithes belonging to the Rectory of Batcombe, in or within the said Common of Norwood; and for confirming all the several other Parts of the said Common to the several Proprietors thereof, discharged of all Right of Common and Tithes belonging to the said Rectory.
Fowler's Estate Act 1782	22 Geo. 3. c. 32 Pr.	5 July 1782
An Act for vesting the Estates late in Jointure to Dame Sarah Fowler Widow, in Trustees to be sold, conveyed and settled, pursuant to a Decree of the Court of Exchequer.
Eggers' Naturalization Act 1782	22 Geo. 3. c. 33 Pr.	5 July 1782
An Act for naturalizing Henry Eggers.

=== Sources ===
- Pickering, Danby, ed. (1782). "Anno vicesimo secuncdo Georgii III". The Statutes at Large. Vol. 34. Cambridge. pp. 1–199 – via Google Books.
- Journals of the House of Commons. Vol. 38. London: His Majesty's Stationery Office. 1803. pp. 567–1148 – via Google Books.
- Chronological Table of and Index to the Statutes. Vol. 1: To the End of the Session 59 Vict. Sess. 2 (1895) (13th ed.). London: Her Majesty's Stationery Office. 1896. pp. 139–140 – via Google Books.
- "Acts of the Parliament of Great Britain from 1782". legislation.gov.uk. The National Archives.

== See also ==
- List of acts of the Parliament of Great Britain
