= Statute Law Revision Act 1875 =

Act of the Parliament of the United Kingdom

Statute Law Revision Act 1875 (Note: Section 4.)
- Act of Parliament
- Parliament of the United Kingdom
- Long title: An Act for further promoting the Revision of the Statute Law by repealing certain Enactments which have ceased to be in force or have become unnecessary.
- Citation: 38 & 39 Vict. c. 66
- Introduced by: Hugh Cairns, 1st Earl Cairns (Lords)
- Territorial extent: United Kingdom

Dates
- Royal assent: 11 August 1875
- Commencement: 11 August 1875 (Note: The Acts of Parliament (Commencement) Act 1793.)
Other legislation
Amends	See § Repealed enactments
Repeals/revokes	See § Repealed enactments
Amended by	Statute Law Revision Act 1878; Statute Law Revision Act 1894
Relates to	Repeal of Obsolete Statutes Act 1856; See Statute Law Revision Act

Status: Partially repealed

History of passage through Parliament

Records of Parliamentary debate relating to the statute from Hansard

Text of statute as originally enacted

The Statute Law Revision Act 1875 (38 & 39 Vict. c. 66) is an act of the Parliament of the United Kingdom that repealed for the United Kingdom enactments from 1725 to 1868 which had ceased to be in force or had become necessary. The act was intended, in particular, to facilitate the preparation of the revised edition of the statutes, then in progress.

Section 2 of, and schedule 2 to, the Statute Law Revision Act 1878 (41 & 42 Vict. c. 79) revived several acts repealed by the act, including:

- Lunacy Act 1845 (8 & 9 Vict. c. 100)
- Lunatic Asylums (Ireland) Act 1846 (9 & 10 Vict. c. 115)
- Incumbered Estates (Ireland) Act 1852 (16 & 17 Vict. c. 67)

Section 3 of the Statute Law Revision Act 1878 (41 & 42 Vict. c. 79) replaced the text "The Schedule" in the partial repeal of the Industrial Schools Act 1866 (29 & 30 Vict.) with "The First Schedule".

As of 2026, the act remains partly in force in the United Kingdom.

== Background ==
In the United Kingdom, acts of Parliament remain in force until expressly repealed. Blackstone's Commentaries on the Laws of England, published in the late 18th-century, raised questions about the system and structure of the common law and the poor drafting and disorder of the existing statute book.

From 1810 to 1825, The Statutes of the Realm was published, providing the first authoritative collection of acts. The first statute law revision act was not passed until 1856 with the Repeal of Obsolete Statutes Act 1856 (19 & 20 Vict. c. 64). This approach — focusing on removing obsolete laws from the statute book followed by consolidation — was proposed by Peter Locke King MP, who had been highly critical of previous commissions' approaches, expenditures, and lack of results.

Previous Acts
Year passed	Title	Citation	Effect
1861	Statute Law Revision Act 1861	24 & 25 Vict. c. 101	Repealed or amended over 800 enactments
1863	Statute Law Revision Act 1863	26 & 27 Vict. c. 125	Repealed or amended over 1,600 enactments for England and Wales
1867	Statute Law Revision Act 1867	30 & 31 Vict. c. 59	Repealed or amended over 1,380 enactments
1870	Statute Law Revision Act 1870	33 & 34 Vict. c. 69	Repealed or amended over 250 enactments
1871	Promissory Oaths Act 1871	34 & 35 Vict. c. 48	Repealed or amended almost 200 enactments
1871	Statute Law Revision Act 1871	34 & 35 Vict. c. 116	Repealed or amended over 1,060 enactments
1872	Statute Law Revision Act 1872	35 & 36 Vict. c. 63	Repealed or amended almost 490 enactments
1872	Statute Law (Ireland) Revision Act 1872	35 & 36 Vict. c. 98	Repealed or amended over 1,050 enactments
1872	Statute Law Revision Act 1872 (No. 2)	35 & 36 Vict. c. 97	Repealed or amended almost 260 enactments
1873	Statute Law Revision Act 1873	36 & 37 Vict. c. 91	Repealed or amended 1,225 enactments
1874	Statute Law Revision Act 1874	37 & 38 Vict. c. 35	Repealed or amended over 490 enactments
1874	Statute Law Revision Act 1874 (No. 2)	37 & 38 Vict. c. 96	Repealed or amended almost 470 enactments

== Passage ==
The Statute Law Revision Bill had its first reading in the House of Lords on 5 July 1875, introduced by the Lord Chancellor, Hugh Cairns, 1st Earl Cairns. The bill had its second reading in the House of Lords on 26 June 1874 and was referred to a committee of the whole house. In his speech introducing the bill, the Lord Chancellor, Hugh Cairns, 1st Earl Cairns mentioned that this was the eleventh volume of statute revision work and that further consolidation bills would be presented to Parliament for consideration during the parliamentary recess. The committee met and reported on 27 July 1875, without amendments. The bill had its third reading in the House of Lords on 29 July 1874 and passed, without amendments.

The bill its first reading in the House of Commons on 30 July 1875. The bill had its second reading in the House of Commons on 2 August 1875 and was committed to a committee of the whole house, which met and reported without amendment on 3 August 1875. The bill had its third reading in the House of Commons on 4 August 1875 and passed, without amendments.

The bill was granted royal assent on 11 August 1875.

== Subsequent developments ==
The act was intended, in particular, to facilitate the preparation of a revised edition of the statutes.

The act was amended by sections 2 and 3 of the Statute Law Revision Act 1878 (46 & 47 Vict. c. 39), which came into force on 25 August 1883.

Sections 2 and 3 of, and the schedule to, the act, were repealed by section 1 of, and the first schedule to, the Statute Law Revision Act 1894 (57 & 58 Vict. c. 54), which came into force on 25 August 1894.

The enactments which were repealed (whether for the whole or any part of the United Kingdom) by the act were repealed so far as they extended to the Isle of Man by section 1(1) of, and schedule 1 to, the Statute Law Revision (Isle of Man) Act 1991, which came into force on 25 July 1991.

The act was retained for the Republic of Ireland by section 2(2)(a) of, and part 4 of schedule 1 to, the Statute Law Revision Act 2007, which came into force on 8 May 2007.

As to repeals by this act, see Campbell v Cochrane and Clarke v Bradlaugh. As to omission of parts of the Naval Discipline Act 1866 (29 & 30 Vict. c. 109) repealed by the act from copies of that act, see section 7(2) of the Naval Discipline Act 1884 (47 & 48 Vict. c. 39).

== Repealed enactments ==
Section 1 of the act repealed 1,401 enactments, listed in the schedule to the act, across six categories: (Note: The Note of the bill, unlike the schedule, gives commentary on each act, noting any earlier repeals and the reason for the new repeal.)

- Expired
- Spent
- Repealed in general terms
- Virtually repealed
- Superseded
- Obsolete

Section 1 of the act included several safeguards to ensure that the repeal does not negatively affect existing rights or ongoing legal matters. Specifically, any legal rights, privileges, or remedies already obtained under the repealed laws, as well as any legal proceedings or principles established by them, remain unaffected. Section 1 of the act also ensured that repealed enactments that have been incorporated into other laws would continue to have legal effect in those contexts. Moreover, the repeal would not revive any former rights, offices, or jurisdictions that had already been abolished.

Section 2 of the act repealed the Consecration of Bishops Abroad Act 1786 (26 Geo. 3 c. 84), effective from the passing of the Colonial Clergy Act 1874 (37 & 38 Vict. c. 77), and provided that any previous legal protections or provisions that had been included in the original Act would not apply to this repeal.

Section 3 of the act provided that section 25 of the Licensing (Scotland) Act 1828 (9 Geo. 4. c. 58), which had been repealed by the Statute Law Revision Act 1873 (36 & 37 Vict. c. 91), was revived, as from the repeal thereof, and that all proceedings taken thereunder since that repeal were as valid and effectual as if that section had not been repealed.

Citation	Short title	Title	Extent of repeal
12 Geo. 1. c. 4	Malt Duties, etc. Act 1725	An Act the title of which begins with the words,—An Act for continuing the Duties upon Malt,—and ends with the words,—Lottery Tickets and Orders, lost, burnt, or otherwise destroyed.	The whole act.
1 & 2 Geo. 4. c. 77	Gaol Fees Abolition (Ireland) Act 1821	An Act to abolish the Payment by Prisoners in Ireland of Gaol Fees, and all other Fees relating to the Custody, Maintenance, Trial, or Discharge of such Prisoners, and to prevent Abuses by Gaolers, Bailiffs, and other Officers.	Section Eight.
3 Geo. 4. c. 18	Duties on Malt Act 1822	An Act to lower the Excise Duty on Malt charged by an Act made in the Second Year of His present Majesty, to allow the said Duty on Malt in Stock, and to make Regulations for better securing the Duties on Malt.	The whole act.
6 Geo. 4. c. 50	Juries Act 1825	An Act for consolidating and amending the Laws relative to Jurors and Juries.	Section Five from "and shall annex" to the end of that Section. Section Six to "upon any High Constable" and from "provided also, that where any Parish or Township" to the end of that Section. Section Ten, the words "to the High Constable and" and from "and the High Constable shall receive" to the end of that Section. Section Forty-seven. Section Forty-six, the words "to any High Constable, or". The Warrant for returning Lists of Jurors, and Precept for returning Lists of Jurors, in the Schedule.
7 Geo. 4. c. 74	Prisons (Ireland) Act 1826	An Act for consolidating and amending the Laws relating to Prisons in Ireland.	Sections One hundred and eighteen to One hundred and twenty-two. Section One hundred and twenty-three so far as it relates to the Marshalsea of the Four Courts. Section One hundred and thirty-nine.
9 Geo. 4. c. 14	Statute of Frauds Amendment Act 1828	An Act for rendering a written Memorandum necessary to the Validity of certain Promises and Engagements.	Section Five.
9 Geo. 4. c. 83	Australian Courts Act 1828	An Act to provide for the Administration of Justice in New South Wales and Van Diemen's Land, and for the more effectual Government thereof, and for other Purposes relating thereto.	Section Thirty-eight. Repealed as to all Her Majesty's Dominions.
11 Geo. 4 & 1 Will. 4. c. 49	Excise Act 1830	An Act to impose a Duty on Beer and Spirits.	The whole act.
2 & 3 Will. 4. c. 88	Representation of the People (Ireland) Act 1832	An Act to amend the Representation of the People of Ireland.	Section Fifty-five from "and that all Elections" to the end of that Section. Section Sixty-eight from "and such Deputy" to the end of that Section.
3 & 4 Will. 4. c. 41	Judicial Committee Act 1833	An Act for the better Administration of Justice in His Majesty's Privy Council.	Section Twenty-nine.
3 & 4 Will. 4. c. 74	Fines and Recoveries Act 1833	An Act for the Abolition of Fines and Recoveries, and for the Substitution of more simple Modes of Assurance.	Section Eight, the words "and two persons shall in such cases be present".
4 & 5 Will. 4. c. 36	Central Criminal Court Act 1834	An Act for establishing a new Court for the Trial of Offences committed in the Metropolis and Parts adjoining.	Section Thirteen.
4 & 5 Will. 4. c. 85	Beerhouse Act 1834	An Act to amend an Act passed in the First Year of His present Majesty relating to the Sale of Beer and Cider by Retail in England.	Section Twenty from "and also with reference to the Sureties of such Persons", "and to the Sureties of all such Persons in respect of such Offences", and "and to the Sureties of such Persons".
5 & 6 Will. 4. c. 76	Municipal Corporations Act 1835	An Act to provide for the Regulation of Municipal Corporations in England and Wales.	Section Four from "and also such Days and no other than fifteen Days after such Vacancy". Sections One hundred and twenty-two and One hundred and twenty-three.
6 & 7 Will. 4. c. 106	Stannaries Act 1836	An Act to make Provision for the better and more expeditious Administration of Justice in the Stannaries of Cornwall, and for enlarging the Jurisdiction and improving the Practice and Proceedings in the Courts of the said Stannaries.	Section Eight, the words "shall not exceed".
7 Will. 4 & 1 Vict. c. 82	County Fermanagh Baronies Act 1837	An Act to amend the Law relating to Grand Juries in Ireland, so far as respects the County of Fermanagh to reconstruct the Baronial Subdivisions of the said County.	Section Two from "and are hereby" to the end of that Section.
2 & 3 Vict. c. 47	Metropolitan Police Act 1839	An Act for improving the Police in and near the Metropolis.	Section Twenty-five.
2 & 3 Vict. c. 70	New South Wales and Van Diemen's Land Act 1839	An Act the title of which begins with the words,—An Act to amend an Act of King George the Fourth to provide for the Administration of Justice in New South Wales and Van Diemen's Land,—and ends with the words,—Parliament.	Repealed as to all Her Majesty's Dominions.
2 & 3 Vict. c. 75	Constabulary (Ireland) Act 1839	An Act for the better Regulation of the Constabulary Force in Ireland.	Section Five, the word "Paymasters". Section Seven, the words "Paymaster and". Section Nine, Paragraphs Eighteen, Twenty, and Twenty-one. Section Twenty-four from " and the Payment " to the end of that Section. Sections Twenty-six to Twenty- eight.
2 & 3 Vict. c. 78	Dublin Police Act 1839	An Act to make further Provisions relating to the Police in the District of Dublin Metropolis.	Sections Eleven and Seventeen.
3 & 4 Vict. c. 29	Vaccination Act 1840	An Act to extend the Practice of Vaccination.	The whole Act, so far as it relates to Ireland.
3 & 4 Vict. c. 62	New South Wales and Van Diemen's Land Act 1840	An Act the title of which begins with the words,—An Act to continue,—and ends with the words,—New South Wales and Van Diemen's Land, and for the more effectual Government thereof, and for other Purposes relating thereto.	Sections One and Four. Repealed as to all Her Majesty's Dominions.
3 & 4 Vict. c. 96	Post Office (Duties) Act 1840	An Act for the Regulation of the Duties of Postage.	Section Twenty from "and in the Sum" to end of that Section.
3 & 4 Vict. c. 103	Dublin Justices Act 1840	An Act to amend an Act of the last Session for making further Provisions relating to the Police in the District of Dublin Metropolis.	Section Three.
3 & 4 Vict. c. 105	Debtors (Ireland) Act 1840	An Act for abolishing Arrest on Mesne Process in Civil Actions, except in certain Cases; for extending the Remedies of Creditors against the Property of Debtors; and for the further Amendment of the Law and the better Advancement of Justice in Ireland.	Sections Forty-six, Forty-seven, Fifty-one, and Fifty-two.
3 & 4 Vict. c. 108	Municipal Corporations (Ireland) Act 1840	An Act for the Regulation of Municipal Corporations in Ireland.	Section One hundred and ninety-five.
4 & 5 Vict. c. 32	Vaccination Act 1841	An Act to amend and extend the Practice of Vaccination.	The whole Act, so far as it relates to Ireland.
5 & 6 Vict. c. 61	Treason Act 1842	An Act to provide for the better Government of South Australia.	Sections One to Three, Nine, Twelve, and Fourteen. Repealed as to all Her Majesty's Dominions.
5 & 6 Vict. c. 76	Australian Constitutions Act 1842	An Act for the Government of New South Wales and Van Diemen's Land.	Sections Fifty-five and Fifty-six. Repealed as to all Her Majesty's Dominions.
7 & 8 Vict. c. 72	New South Wales Act 1844	An Act to clear up Doubts as to the Regulation and Audit of the Accounts of the Customs in New South Wales.	Repealed as to all Her Majesty's Dominions.
7 & 8 Vict. c. 74	Australian Constitutions Act 1844	An Act to explain and amend the Act for the Government of New South Wales and Van Diemen's Land.	Sections Two, Four, Nine, and Ten. Repealed as to all Her Majesty's Dominions.
7 & 8 Vict. c. 107	Common Law Offices (Ireland) Act 1844	An Act to regulate and reduce the Expenses of the Officers attached to the Superior Courts of Law in Ireland payable out of the Consolidated Fund.	Section Twenty-eight, so far as relates to the Marshal of the Marshalsea of the Four Courts.
8 & 9 Vict. c. 1	Supply Act 1845	An Act to apply the Sum of Eight Millions out of the Consolidated Fund to the Service of the Year One thousand eight hundred and forty-five.	The whole act.
8 & 9 Vict. c. 2	Stamps Act 1845	An Act the title of which begins with the words,—An Act to continue for Three Years the Stamp Duties,—and ends with the words,—until the Tenth Day of October One thousand eight hundred and forty-five.	The whole act.
8 & 9 Vict. c. 4	Income Tax Act 1845	An Act to continue for Three Years the Duties on Posts and Profits arising from Property, Professions, Trades, and Offices.	The whole act.
8 & 9 Vict. c. 6	Glass Duties Repeal Act 1845	An Act to repeal the Duties and Laws of Excise on Glass.	The whole act.
8 & 9 Vict. c. 7	Certain Export Duties Repeal Act 1845	An Act to repeal the Duties of Customs due upon the Exportation of certain Goods from the United Kingdom.	The whole act.
8 & 9 Vict. c. 8	Mutiny Act 1845	An Act for punishing Mutiny and Desertion, and for the better Payment of the Army and their Quarters.	The whole act.
8 & 9 Vict. c. 9	Marine Mutiny Act 1845	An Act for the Regulation of Her Majesty's Royal Marine Forces while on shore.	The whole act.
8 & 9 Vict. c. 10	Bastardy Act 1845	An Act to make certain Provisions for Proceedings in Bastardy.	Sections One, Two, and Twelve. The Schedule.
8 & 9 Vict. c. 11	Sheriffs (Wales) Act 1845	An Act for assigning Sheriffs in Wales.	Section Two.
8 & 9 Vict. c. 15	Auctioneers Act 1845	An Act to repeal the Duties of Excise on Sales by Auction, and to impose a new Duty on the Licence to be taken out by all Auctioneers in the United Kingdom.	Section One. Section Four from "that Auctioneers" to "last-mentioned Licence list". Section Seven from "The Authority of an Act passed in the Sixth and Seventh" to "Bill in Ireland", and so far as it relates to the repeal of part of c. 4. c. 53. Section Nine.
8 & 9 Vict. c. 16	Companies Clauses Consolidation Act 1845	An Act to regulate the Application of certain Provisions usually inserted in Acts with respect to the Constitution of Companies incorporated for carrying on Undertakings of a public Nature.	Section One hundred and fifty-two from "of the Place" to end of that Section. Section One hundred and sixty-four from "in case" to "Law". Section One hundred and sixty-five.
8 & 9 Vict. c. 17	Companies Clauses Consolidation (Scotland) Act 1845	An Act for regulating the Application of certain Provisions usually inserted in Acts with respect to the Constitution of Companies incorporated for carrying on Undertakings of a public Nature in Scotland.	Section One hundred and sixty-seven.
8 & 9 Vict. c. 18	Lands Clauses Consolidation Act 1845	An Act for consolidating in One Act certain Provisions usually inserted in Acts authorizing the taking of Lands for Undertakings of a public Nature.	Section One hundred and fifty-three from "or if the Place" to end of that Section.
8 & 9 Vict. c. 19	Lands Clauses Consolidation (Scotland) Act 1845	An Act for consolidating in One Act certain Provisions usually inserted in Acts authorizing the taking of Lands for Undertakings of a public Nature in Scotland.	Section One hundred and forty-four.
8 & 9 Vict. c. 20	Railways Clauses Consolidation Act 1845	An Act for consolidating in One Act certain Provisions usually inserted in Acts authorizing the making of Railways.	Section One hundred and fifty from "or if the Place" to end of that Section. Sections One hundred and sixty-one and One hundred and sixty-five.
8 & 9 Vict. c. 23	Exchequer Bills Act 1845	An Act for raising the Sum of Nine millions three hundred and seventy-nine thousand six hundred Pounds by Exchequer Bills for the Service of the Year One thousand eight hundred and forty-five.	The whole act.
8 & 9 Vict. c. 26	Trout (Scotland) Act 1845	An Act to prevent taking for Trout or other Fresh-water Fish by Nets in the Rivers and Waters in Scotland.	Section Twelve.
8 & 9 Vict. c. 28	Canal Tolls Act 1845	An Act to empower Canal Companies and the Commissioners of Navigation Rivers to vary their Tolls, Rates, and Charges on different Parts of their Navigations.	Section Seven.
8 & 9 Vict. c. 30	Judicial Committee Act 1845	An Act to amend an Act passed in the Third and Fourth Years of the Reign of His late Majesty King William the Fourth, intituled An Act for the better Administration of Justice in His Majesty's Privy Council.	Section One. Section Two from "after the said" to "forty-six". Repealed as to all Her Majesty's Dominions.
8 & 9 Vict. c. 32	Mortgage of County Rates, Middlesex Act 1845	An Act to alter and amend the Laws enabling Justices of the Peace in certain Cases to borrow Money on Mortgage of the Rates, so far as the same relate to the County of Middlesex.	Section One. Section Two from "twenty-nine" to "the Reign of His said Majesty King George the Fourth, and also", and from "and also what is" to "the said County,". Sections Four and Six.
8 & 9 Vict. c. 33	Railways Clauses Consolidation (Scotland) Act 1845	An Act for consolidating in One Act certain Provisions usually inserted in Acts authorizing the making of Railways in Scotland.	Section One hundred and fifty-five.
8 & 9 Vict. c. 34	Seal Office in Courts of Queen's Bench and Common Pleas Act 1845	An Act for abolishing the separate Office of the Courts of Queen's Bench and Common Pleas.	Repealed from the commencement of the "Supreme Court of Judicature Act, 1873," except so far as relates to any annuity for the time being payable under this Act.
8 & 9 Vict. c. 35	Infeftment Act 1845	An Act to simplify the Form and diminish the Expense of obtaining Indictment in Heritable Property in Scotland.	Section Eleven.
8 & 9 Vict. c. 37	Bankers (Ireland) Act 1845	An Act to regulate the Issue of Bank Notes in Ireland, and to regulate the Repayment of certain Sums advanced by the Governor and Company of the Bank of Ireland for the Public Service.	Section One to "directive" (where those words last occur). Section Five. Section Twenty-nine from "Provided always, that it shall" to end of that Section. Sections Thirty-one and Thirty-three.
8 & 9 Vict. c. 38	Bank Notes (Scotland) Act 1845	An Act to regulate the Issue of Bank Notes in Scotland.	Section Twenty-three.
8 & 9 Vict. c. 39	Wages Arrestment (Scotland) Act 1845	An Act to amend the Law as to the Arrestment of Wages in Scotland.	Section Two.
8 & 9 Vict. c. 40	Parish Schoolmasters (Scotland) Act 1845	An Act for amending an Act for making Provision for Parish Schoolmasters in Scotland.	The whole act.
8 & 9 Vict. c. 41	Highways, etc. (Scotland) Act 1845	An Act for amending the Laws concerning Highways, Bridges, and Ferries in Scotland, and the making and maintaining thereof by Statute Service, and by the Conversion of Statute Service into Money.	Section Thirty-nine to "Acts". Section Forty-five to "had not been passed; and".
8 & 9 Vict. c. 42	Canal Carriers Act 1845	An Act to enable Canal Companies to become Carriers of Goods upon their Canals.	Section Nineteen.
8 & 9 Vict. c. 46	Museums Act 1845	An Act for the Appointment of additional Constables for keeping the Peace near Public Works in Ireland.	Section Four.
8 & 9 Vict. c. 49	Sir H. Pottinger's Annuity Act 1845	An Act to settle an Annuity on Sir Henry Pottinger, Baronet, in consideration of his eminent Services.	The whole act.
8 & 9 Vict. c. 50	West India Island Relief Act 1845	An Act to facilitate the Recovery of Loans made by the West India Relief Commissioners.	Section Six.
8 & 9 Vict. c. 53	Turnpike Acts Continuance Act 1845	An Act to continue to the First Day of October One thousand eight hundred and forty-six, and to the End of the then next Session of Parliament, certain Turnpike Acts.	The whole act.
8 & 9 Vict. c. 56	Land Drainage Act 1845	An Act to alter and amend an Act passed in the Third and Fourth Years of the Reign of Her present Majesty Victoria, intituled An Act to enable the Owners of Settled Estates to defray the Expenses of draining the same by way of Mortgage.	Section Nine. Section Twelve, the words "and of the Proceedings before the Master". Section Fourteen from "Provided" to end of that Section. Section Fifteen.
8 & 9 Vict. c. 57	Art Unions Indemnity Act 1845	An Act to extend the Indemnity of Members of Art Unions against certain Penalties.	The whole act.
8 & 9 Vict. c. 58	Militia Ballots Suspension Act 1845	An Act to suspend until the First Day of October One thousand eight hundred and forty-six the making of Lists of Persons liable to serve on Juries for the Militia of the United Kingdom.	The whole act.
8 & 9 Vict. c. 59	Highway Rates Act 1845	An Act to continue to the First Day of October One thousand eight hundred and forty-six, and to the End of the then next Session of Parliament, an Act to amend the Laws relating to Highway Rates.	The whole act.
8 & 9 Vict. c. 60	Loan Societies Act 1845	An Act to continue to the First Day of October One thousand eight hundred and forty-six, and to the End of the then next Session of Parliament, the Act to amend the Laws relating to Loan Societies.	The whole act.
8 & 9 Vict. c. 61	Turnpike Trusts (South Wales) Act 1845	An Act to make certain further Provisions for the Consolidation of Turnpike Trusts in South Wales.	Sections Four to Eight, Ten, Thirteen, and Fifteen.
8 & 9 Vict. c. 63	Geological Survey Act 1845	An Act to facilitate the Completion of a Geological Survey of Great Britain and Ireland under the Direction of the First Commissioner for the time being of Her Majesty's Woods and Works.	Section Seven.
8 & 9 Vict. c. 64	Spirits (Ireland) Act 1845	An Act to amend certain Regulations respecting the Retail of Spirits in Ireland.	Section One to "shall be repealed; and that", and from "and by another Act of the Second" to end of that Section. Sections Four and Five.
8 & 9 Vict. c. 65	Duties on Spirits Act 1845	An Act the title of which begins with the words,—An Act to determine the countervailing Duties payable on Spirits,—and ends with the words,—compound Spirits from the said Islands.	The whole act.
8 & 9 Vict. c. 66	Queen's Colleges (Ireland) (No. 2) Act 1845	An Act to enable Her Majesty to endow new Colleges for the Advancement of Learning in Ireland.	Sections One and Twenty-one.
8 & 9 Vict. c. 68	Bail in Error Act 1845	An Act to stay Execution of Judgment for Misdemeanours upon giving Bail in Error.	Section One from "whether" to "this Act", and from "to prosecute" to "adjudged;". Sections Three, Five, and Seven.
8 & 9 Vict. c. 69	Drainage (Ireland) Act 1845	An Act to amend an Act of the Sixth Year of Her present Majesty, for promoting the Drainage of Lands, and Navigation and Water Power in connexion with such Drainage, in Ireland.	Sections Six and Twenty-nine.
8 & 9 Vict. c. 70	Church Building Act 1845	An Act for the further Amendment of the Church Building Acts.	Section Three. Section Nine from "and shall state" to "to belong;" and from "and the Right" to "for his Licence;". Section Sixteen from "cancelled" to "or". Section Twenty-two from "and the Powers" to end of that Section.
8 & 9 Vict. c. 71	Highway Act 1845	An Act to extend certain Provisions in the Act for consolidating and amending the Laws relating to Highways in England.	Section Three.
8 & 9 Vict. c. 73	Shrewsbury and Holyhead Road Act 1845	An Act to enable the Commissioners of Her Majesty's Woods and Works to apply certain Monies now in their Hands towards discharging the Incumbrances affecting the Shrewsbury and Holyhead Road.	The whole act.
8 & 9 Vict. c. 74	Lotteries Act 1845	An Act to amend an Act of the Seventh Year of King William the Fourth, for preventing the advertising of Foreign and other illegal Lotteries, and to discontinue certain Actions commenced under the Provisions of the said Act.	Sections One, Two, and Five.
8 & 9 Vict. c. 76	Libel Act 1845	An Act the title of which begins with the words,—An Act to increase the Stamp Duty on Licences to Appraisers,—and ends with the words,—regulating the Issue of Bank Notes in England.	Section One from "from" to "thereof". Section Six.
8 & 9 Vict. c. 77	Hosiery Act 1845	An Act to make further Regulations respecting the Tickets of Work to be delivered to Persons employed in the Manufacture of Hosiery, in certain Cases.	Section One from "from" to "forty-six". Section Two.
8 & 9 Vict. c. 78	Abolition of Offices in Courts of Law Act 1845	An Act to provide for the Payment of Compensation Allowances to certain Persons connected with the Courts of Law in England, for Loss of Fees and Emoluments.	The whole act.
8 & 9 Vict. c. 79	Poor Rates Act 1845	An Act the title of which begins with the words,—An Act to continue until the First Day of October,—and ends with the words,—rated as such, in respect of Stock in Trade or other Property, to the Relief of the Poor.	The whole act.
8 & 9 Vict. c. 80	Quarter Sessions (Ireland) Act 1845	An Act for regulating the Criminal Jurisdiction of Assistant Barristers as to certain Counties of Cities and Counties of Towns in Ireland.	Sections Two and Three.
8 & 9 Vict. c. 81	Grand Jury (Dublin) Act 1845	An Act to amend an Act of the last Session, for consolidating and amending the Laws for the Regulation of Grand Jury Presentments in the County of Dublin.	Sections One, Six, Seven, Ten, and Thirteen.
8 & 9 Vict. c. 82	Militia Pay Act 1845	An Act the title of which begins with the words,—An Act to defray until the First Day of August One thousand eight hundred and forty-five,—Militia—and to authorize the Employment of the Non-commissioned Officers.	The whole act.
8 & 9 Vict. c. 83	Poor Law (Scotland) Act 1845	An Act for the Amendment and better Administration of the Laws relating to the Relief of the Poor in Scotland.	Section Fifty-nine from "and the Inspector" to end of that Section. Section Sixty-three. Section Ninety-seven to "also, that".
8 & 9 Vict. c. 84	Customs (Repeal) Act 1845	An Act to repeal the several Laws relating to the Customs.	The whole act.
8 & 9 Vict. c. 87	Prevention of Smuggling Act 1845	An Act for the Prevention of Smuggling.	Repealed as to all Her Majesty's Dominions.
8 & 9 Vict. c. 90	Duties of Customs Act 1845	An Act for granting Duties of Customs.	Repealed as to all Her Majesty's Dominions.
8 & 9 Vict. c. 95	Waste Lands (Van Diemen's Land) Act 1845	An Act to exempt Van Diemen's Land from the Provisions of an Act, intituled An Act for regulating the Sale of Waste Land belonging to the Crown in the Australian Colonies.	Repealed as to all Her Majesty's Dominions.
8 & 9 Vict. c. 99	Crown Lands Act 1845	An Act the title of which begins with the words,—An Act to punish and prevent Trespass upon Her Majesty's Woods, Forests, Parks and Chases,—and for other Purposes relating to the Land Revenue.	Section Three. Section Five from "and every" to end of that Section.
8 & 9 Vict. c. 100	Lunacy Act 1845	An Act for the Regulation of the Care and Treatment of Lunatics.	Section One and Two. Section Three from "out of the Monies" to "mentioned", and from "by Four coin" to end of that Section. Section Nine from "and the said Wilfred Skeffington Lutwidge" and from "the said Wilfred Skeffington Lutwidge, or either" and from "out of the Monies" to "mentioned", and from "by Four coin" to end of that Section. Section Eleven from "or of any" to "them", and from "and said Salaries" to end of that Section. Section Thirteen. Section Twenty-four from "Provided always, that all" to end of that Section. Section Thirty-three. Section Forty, the words "and paid" (where they last occur). Section Forty-one from "either" to "Act". Section Forty-two from " either before " to " Act,”.. Section Fifty-two from "according to Act, ". Section Fifty-nine from " according " to Act;" . 66 Section Eighty-two from " Provided " to end of that Section. Section Ninety from 66 or under" to " repealed,". "" Section Ninety-nine from " or by " to "herein-before repealed ", and the words or has received and " or any of the said repealed Acts, ". 66 Section One hundred and five from or of any " to " repealed,". Sections One hundred and seven and One hundred and eighteen. Schedules (B.), (C.), (D.), (F.), and (H.). (Note: This act was partially revived by the Statute Law Revision Act 1878 (41 & 42 Vict. c. 79): "So much of Sections ninety-nine and One hundred and five as was repealed by the Statute Law Revision Act, 1875.")
8 & 9 Vict. c. 102	Usury Act 1845	An Act to continue until the First Day of January One thousand eight hundred and fifty-one an Act for exempting certain Bills of Exchange and Promissory Notes from the Operation of the Laws relating to Usury.	The whole act.
8 & 9 Vict. c. 103	Bonded Corn Act 1845	An Act the title of which begins with the words,—An Act to continue until the Thirty-first Day of August,—and ends with the words,—Substitution of an equivalent Quantity of Flour or Biscuit in lieu thereof.	The whole act.
8 & 9 Vict. c. 105	Court of Chancery Act 1845	An Act the title of which begins with the words,—An Act for amending certain Acts of the Fourth and Fifth Years,—and ends with the words,—Duties of the Subpoena Office after the Death, Resignation, or Removal of the present Patentee of that Office.	The whole act.
8 & 9 Vict. c. 106	Real Property Act 1845	An Act to amend the Law of Real Property.	Section One.
8 & 9 Vict. c. 107	Central Criminal Lunatic Asylum (Ireland) Act 1845	An Act the title of which begins with the words,—An Act for the Establishment of a Central Asylum for insane Persons charged with Offences in Ireland,—and ends with the words,—District Lunatic Asylums.	Sections Eighteen and Twenty-eight.
8 & 9 Vict. c. 108	Fisheries (Ireland) Act 1845	An Act for the further Amendment of an Act of the Sixth Year of Her present Majesty for regulating the Irish Fisheries.	Section Twenty-seven.
8 & 9 Vict. c. 109	Gaming Act 1845	An Act to amend the Law concerning Games and Wagers.	Section One. Section Ten from "required" to "for such Billiard Licence, and". Section Fourteen from "Penalties in the Case" to end of that Section. Sections Fifteen, Sixteen, and Twenty-six.
8 & 9 Vict. c. 110	Borough and Watch Rates Act 1845	An Act for the better collecting Poor Rates and Watch Rates in certain Places.	Section One. Section Two from "such" to "any". Section Three from "by any such" to "aforesaid, or". Section Four from "any", and", the words "District Rate, or" and "general Borough Rate or", and from "and that" to "Denomination to be made and laid on such Place by the Council of such Borough". Section Five, the words "any District Rate, or" and "District Rate, or" (wherever they occur). Section Seven from "for the Person" to "them, and", the word "Parishes," (where it next occurs), and the words "District Rate, or" (wherever they occur). Sections Eight and Nine.
8 & 9 Vict. c. 113	Evidence Act 1845	An Act to facilitate the Admission in Evidence of certain official and other Documents.	Sections Six and Seven.
8 & 9 Vict. c. 115	Chancery Taxing Master (Ireland) Act 1845	An Act for the Appointment of a Taxing Master to the High Court of Chancery in Ireland.	Sections Twelve and Sixteen.
8 & 9 Vict. c. 117	Poor Removal Act 1845	An Act to amend the Laws relating to the Removal of Poor Persons born in Scotland, Ireland, the Islands of Man, Scilly, Jersey, or Guernsey, and chargeable in England.	Sections One and Nine. Schedules (A.) and (B.). Schedule (C.) so far as it relates to Ireland.
8 & 9 Vict. c. 118	Inclosure Act 1845	An Act the title of which begins with the words,—An Act to facilitate the Inclosure and Improvement of Commons and Lands held in common,—and ends with the words,—Revival of such Powers in certain Cases.	Section One. Section Two to "Execution of this Act; and". Section Three from "the several" to "and all others from", from "which may not" to "Direction of Parliament", from "as well" to "Case aforesaid", the words "under this Act" (where they first occur), and from "in Inclosures" to "authorised, and". Sections Four and Five. Section Six to "Appointments under this Act; and". Section Seven. Section Twenty-three, the words "to sanction such Inclosure, or" and "as the Case may require". Section Twenty-seven from "to authorize" to "or (as the Case may be)", from "if the Land" to "without the previous Direction of Parliament", and from "and" to "in the Land" to "contained". Section Twenty-eight from "proceed" to "Trust, or". Section Thirty-three from "or in the" to "with an Inclosure under this Act". Section Thirty-four, the words "(if any)" (where they last occur). Section Thirty-five from "who shall" to "least". Section Forty-seven from "stating" to "delivered". Section One hundred and thirty-eight from "pursuant to the Method" to "General of the said Court;". Section One hundred and sixty-nine.
8 & 9 Vict. c. 121	Counties of Drogheda and Meath Act 1845	An Act to title of which begins with the words,—An Act to amend and explain certain Provisions of an Act of the Third and Fourth Years,—and ends with the words,—Alienation of Corporate Property in Ireland.	Sections Two to Eight, Ten, and Eleven.
8 & 9 Vict. c. 123	Naval Medical Supplemental Fund Society Act 1845	An Act to authorize until the End of the next Session of Parliament an Alteration of the Annuities and Premiums of the Naval Medical Supplemental Fund Society.	The whole act.
8 & 9 Vict. c. 125	Turnpike Acts (Ireland) Act 1845	An Act to continue until the Thirty-first Day of July One thousand eight hundred and forty-seven, and to the End of the then Session of Parliament, certain Acts for regulating Turnpike Roads in Ireland.	The whole act.
8 & 9 Vict. c. 127	Small Debts Act 1845	An Act for the better securing the Payment of Small Debts.	Schedules (A.), (B.), and (D.).
8 & 9 Vict. c. 128	Silk Weavers Act 1845	An Act to make further Regulations respecting the Tickets of Work to be delivered to Silk Weavers in certain Cases.	Section One from "from" to "forty-five". Section Nine.
8 & 9 Vict. c. 129	Exchequer Bills Act 1845	An Act for raising the Sum of Nine millions and twenty-four thousand nine hundred Pounds by Exchequer Bills, for the Service of the Year One thousand eight hundred and forty-five.	The whole act.
8 & 9 Vict. c. 130	Appropriation Act 1845	An Act the title of which begins with the words,—An Act to apply the Sum,—and ends with the words,—and to appropriate the Supplies granted in this Session of Parliament.	The whole act.
9 & 10 Vict. c. 1	Public Works (Ireland) (No. 1) Act 1846	An Act for the further Amendment of the Acts for the Extension and Promotion of Public Works in Ireland.	Sections One and Thirteen.
9 & 10 Vict. c. 2	County Works (Ireland) Act 1846	An Act the title of which begins with the words,—An Act to authorize Grand Juries in Ireland,—and ends with the words,—Payment of Contractors for Works under Grand Jury Presentments in Ireland.	Except Section Twenty.
9 & 10 Vict. c. 3	Fisheries (Ireland) Act 1846	An Act to encourage the Sea Fisheries of Ireland, by promoting and aiding with Grants of Public Money the Construction of Piers, Harbours, and other Works.	Sections Three and Sixty-four to Sixty-nine. Section Seventy-seven so far as it relates to the application of penalties. Sections Eighty-two and Eighty-eight.
9 & 10 Vict. c. 4	Drainage (Ireland) Act 1846	An Act the title of which begins with the words,—An Act to amend the Laws for the Provision of Land,—and ends with the words,—labouring Classes in Works of Drainage during the present Year.	Sections Forty-five to Fifty-two.
9 & 10 Vict. c. 6	Fever (Ireland) Act 1846	An Act to make Provision until the First Day of September One thousand eight hundred and forty-seven, for the treatment of poor Persons afflicted with Fever in Ireland.	The whole act.
9 & 10 Vict. c. 7	Supply Act 1846	An Act to apply the Sum of Eight Millions out of the Consolidated Fund to the Service of the Year One thousand eight hundred and forty-six.	The whole act.
9 & 10 Vict. c. 11	Mutiny Act 1846	An Act for punishing Mutiny and Desertion, and for the better Payment of the Army and their Quarters.	The whole act.
9 & 10 Vict. c. 12	Marine Mutiny Act 1846	An Act for the Regulation of Her Majesty's Royal Marine Forces while on shore.	The whole act.
9 & 10 Vict. c. 15	Exchequer Bills Act 1846	An Act for raising the Sum of Eighteen millions three hundred and eighty thousand two hundred Pounds by Exchequer Bills, for the Service of the Year One thousand eight hundred and forty-six.	The whole act.
9 & 10 Vict. c. 17	Burgh Trading Act 1846	An Act for the Abolition of the exclusive Privilege of Trading in Burghs in Scotland.	Section Four.
9 & 10 Vict. c. 18	Print Works Act 1846	An Act to amend Two clerical Errors in an Act of the last Session, for regulating the Labour of Children, young Persons, and Women in Print Works.	The whole act.
9 & 10 Vict. c. 20	Parliamentary Deposits Act 1846	An Act the title of which begins with the words,—An Act to revise and amend an Act of the Second Year,—and ends with the words,—Undertakings to be effected under the Authority of Parliament.	Section One.
9 & 10 Vict. c. 21	Viscount Hardinge's Annuity Act 1846	An Act to enable the Right Honourable Henry Viscount Hardinge to receive the full Benefit of an Annuity of Five thousand Pounds granted to him by the East India Company.	The whole act.
9 & 10 Vict. c. 24	Central Criminal Court Act 1846	An Act for removing some Defects in the Administration of Criminal Justice.	Section Two from "That and" to "repealed; and".
9 & 10 Vict. c. 26	Transportation Act 1846	An Act for abolishing the Office of Superintendent of Convicts under Sentence of Transportation.	Repealed as to all Her Majesty's Dominions.
9 & 10 Vict. c. 33	Seditious Meeting Act 1846	An Act to amend the Laws relating to Corresponding Societies and the licensing of Lecture Rooms.	Section Two.
9 & 10 Vict. c. 35	Western Australia Government Act 1846	An Act the title of which begins with the words,—An Act to continue until the Thirty-first Day of December,—and ends with the words,—Settlements in Western Australia on the Western Coast of New Holland.	The whole act.
9 & 10 Vict. c. 36	Coalwhippers (Port of London) Act 1846	An Act to continue until the First Day of January One thousand eight hundred and fifty-one, and to the End of the then next Session of Parliament, and to amend an Act for establishing an Office for the Relief of Coalwhippers of the Port of London.	The whole act.
9 & 10 Vict. c. 37	Coroners (Ireland) Act 1846	An Act to amend the Laws relating to the Office of Coroner and the Expenses of Inquests in Ireland.	Section One. Section Twenty-three from "Provided also" to end of that Section. Sections Fifty-one and Fifty-three.
9 & 10 Vict. c. 40	Ropeworks Act 1846	An Act to declare certain Ropeworks not within the Operation of the Factory Acts.	Section Two.
9 & 10 Vict. c. 42	New Zealand Company Act 1846	An Act to authorize a Loan from the Consolidated Fund to the New Zealand Company.	Repealed as to all Her Majesty's Dominions.
9 & 10 Vict. c. 43	Militia Ballots Suspension Act 1846	An Act to suspend until the First Day of October One thousand eight hundred and forty-seven the making of Lists and the Ballots and Enrolments for the Militia of the United Kingdom.	The whole act.
9 & 10 Vict. c. 44	Election of Members for Cheshire Act 1846	An Act to suspend the making of Lists and the Ballot of Members to serve in Parliament for the County of Chester, the Boroughs situate within, and for the County of the City of Chester.	Section One from "or to" to "them,". Section Two.
9 & 10 Vict. c. 45	Newfoundland Constitution Act 1846	An Act to continue until the First Day of September One thousand eight hundred and forty-seven certain of the Provisions of an Act of the Fifth and Sixth Years of Her present Majesty respecting the Government of Newfoundland.	Repealed as to all Her Majesty's Dominions.
9 & 10 Vict. c. 46	Ordnance Survey Act 1846	An Act the title of which begins with the words,—An Act to continue until the Thirty-first Day of December,—and ends with the words,—Survey of Great Britain, Berwick-upon-Tweed, and the Isle of Man.	The whole act.
9 & 10 Vict. c. 47	Supply (No. 2) Act 1846	An Act to apply the Sum of Four Millions out of the Consolidated Fund, and the Surplus of Ways and Means, to the Service of the Year One thousand eight hundred and forty-six.	The whole act.
9 & 10 Vict. c. 48	Art Unions Act 1846	An Act for legalizing Art Unions.	Sections Two and Three.
9 & 10 Vict. c. 49	Highway Rates Act 1846	An Act to continue until the First Day of October One thousand eight hundred and forty-seven, and to the End of the then next Session of Parliament, an Act for authorizing the Application of Highway Rates to Turnpike Roads.	The whole act.
9 & 10 Vict. c. 50	Poor Rates Act 1846	An Act the title of which begins with the words,—An Act to continue until the First Day of October,—and ends with the words,—Liability to be rated as such, in respect of Stock in Trade or other Property, to the Relief of the Poor.	The whole act.
9 & 10 Vict. c. 51	Turnpike Acts (Great Britain) Act 1846	An Act to continue certain Turnpike Acts until the First Day of October One thousand eight hundred and forty-seven, and to the End of the then next Session of Parliament.	The whole act.
9 & 10 Vict. c. 52	Loan Societies Act 1846	An Act to continue to the First Day of October One thousand eight hundred and forty-seven, and to the End of the then next Session of Parliament, the Act to amend the Laws relating to Loan Societies.	The whole act.
9 & 10 Vict. c. 53	Copyhold Commission Act 1846	An Act to continue the Copyright Commission until the Thirty-first Day of July One thousand eight hundred and forty-seven, and to the End of the then next Session of Parliament.	The whole act.
9 & 10 Vict. c. 54	Practitioners in Common Pleas Act 1846	An Act to extend to all Barristers practising in the Superior Courts at Westminster the Privileges of Serjeants at Law in the Court of Common Pleas.	Repealed from the commencement of the "Supreme Court of Judicature Act, 1873".
9 & 10 Vict. c. 55	Militia Pay Act 1846	An Act the title of which begins with the words,—An Act to defray until the First Day of August One thousand eight hundred and forty-seven the Charge of the Pay,—and ends with the words,—Militia; and to authorize the Employment of the Non-commissioned Officers.	The whole act.
9 & 10 Vict. c. 56	Assessed Taxes and Income Tax Act 1846	An Act to provide Forms of Proceedings under the Acts relating to the Duties of Assessed Taxes, and the Duties on Profits arising from Property, Professions, Trades, and Offices in England.	Section Four.
9 & 10 Vict. c. 57	Railway Regulation (Gauge) Act 1846	An Act for regulating the Gauge of Railways.	Section Nine.
9 & 10 Vict. c. 59	Religious Disabilities Act 1846	An Act to relieve Her Majesty's Subjects from certain Penalties and Disabilities in regard to Religious Opinions.	Section One, the words "from and after the Commencement of this Act", from "The Statute or Ordinance of the" to "Statutum Judaismo;", from "And whereas the said Act as enacts, that if" to "the same is hereby repealed;", from "Also so much of another Act" to "Her Dominions." and from "Also an Act passed in the" to "seventh" to end of that Section. Section Two to "this Act". Section Three. Section Four to "this Act".
9 & 10 Vict. c. 60	Grand Jury Cess Act 1846	An Act to exempt from Stamp Duty Bonds and Warrants to confess Judgment executed by High Constables or Collectors of Grand Jury Cess, or their Sureties in Ireland.	Section One from "and any such Bond" to end of that Section. Section Two.
9 & 10 Vict. c. 61	Prisons (Ireland) Act 1846	An Act to amend an Act of the Seventh Year of King George the Fourth, for consolidating and amending the Laws relating to Prisons in Ireland.	Section Two.
9 & 10 Vict. c. 62	Deodands Act 1846	An Act to abolish Deodands.	The whole act.
9 & 10 Vict. c. 64	Interpleader (Ireland) Act 1846	An Act to enable Courts of Law in Ireland to give Relief against adverse Claims made upon Persons having no Interest in the Subject Matter of such Claims.	Section Eight.
9 & 10 Vict. c. 66	Poor Removal Act 1846	An Act to amend the Laws relating to the Removal of the Poor.	Section Two.
9 & 10 Vict. c. 67	Citations (Scotland) Act 1846	An Act to remove Doubts concerning Citations, and Service and Execution of Diligence, in Scotland.	Section Two.
9 & 10 Vict. c. 69	Naval Medical Supplemental Fund Society Act 1846	An Act to authorize until the Thirty-first Day of July One thousand eight hundred and forty-seven, and to the End of the then next Session of Parliament, the Regulation of the Annuities and Premiums of the Naval Medical Fund Society.	The whole act.
9 & 10 Vict. c. 70	Inclosure Act 1846	An Act to amend the Act to facilitate the Inclosure and Improvement of Commons and Lands.	Section One, the words "heretofore issued or", from "or in any such Inclosure" (where those words first occur), and from "or in case" (where those words last occur) to "such Inclosure". Sections Thirteen and Fifteen.
9 & 10 Vict. c. 71	County Works (Ireland) (No. 2) Act 1846	An Act the title of which begins with the words,—An Act to amend an Act of the present Session,—and ends with the words,—Payment of Contractors for Works under Grand Jury Presentments in Ireland.	The whole act.
9 & 10 Vict. c. 72	Marriages (Ireland) Act 1846	An Act to amend the Act for Marriages in Ireland, and for registering such Marriages.	Section Five.
9 & 10 Vict. c. 73	Tithe Act 1846	An Act further to amend the Acts for the Commutation of Tithes in England and Wales.	Section Nineteen from "and every Instrument purporting" to end of that Section. Sections Twenty-one and Twenty-four.
9 & 10 Vict. c. 74	Baths and Washhouses Act 1846	An Act to encourage the Establishment of public Baths and Washhouses.	Section One from "Parish" to "its own Poor"; from "Rate-payers" to "Borough Fund", and from "elected under an Act passed in"; to "Poor, or". Section Three. Section Four to "Her Majesty's sign". Section Twenty-two, the words "Council of any such Borough or", "the Borough Fund, or" and "as the Case may be,". Sections Thirty-seven and Forty-one. Schedule.
9 & 10 Vict. c. 75	Joint Stock Banks (Scotland and Ireland) Act 1846	An Act for the Abolition of the exclusive Privilege of Trading, or of regulating Trade, in Cities, Towns, or Boroughs in Ireland.	Sections Two to Four, Seven, and Eight.
9 & 10 Vict. c. 77	House of Commons Offices Act 1846	An Act to amend the Acts relating to the Offices of the House of Commons.	Section Two. Section Three to "instead thereof" and from "and then" to "Expenditure;". Sections Four and Six.
9 & 10 Vict. c. 78	County Works (Ireland) (No. 3) Act 1846	An Act to authorize a further Advance of Money out of the Consolidated Fund towards defraying the Expenses of County Works presented in Ireland.	The whole act.
9 & 10 Vict. c. 79	Lunatic Asylums (Ireland) (No. 1) Act 1846	An Act the title of which begins with the words,—An Act to continue until the Thirty-first Day of July,—and ends with the words,—amending the Law as to Private Lunatic Asylums in Ireland.	The whole act.
9 & 10 Vict. c. 80	Public Works Loans Act 1846	An Act to authorize the Advance of Money out of the Consolidated Fund, for carrying on Public Works and Fisheries, and Employment of the Poor.	The whole act.
9 & 10 Vict. c. 82	New Zealand Company (No. 2) Act 1846	An Act to amend an Act of the present Session for authorizing a Loan from the Consolidated Fund to the New Zealand Company.	Repealed as to all Her Majesty's Dominions.
9 & 10 Vict. c. 83	Public Works Loans (No. 2) Act 1846	An Act to empower the Commissioners for the Issue of Loans for Public Works and Fisheries to make Loans in Money to the Commissioners of Her Majesty's Woods, in lieu of Loans heretofore authorized to be made in Exchequer Bills.	The whole act.
9 & 10 Vict. c. 85	Loans for Public Works (Ireland) Act 1846	An Act to regulate the Application of Money for the Purposes of Loans for carrying on Public Works in Ireland.	The whole act.
9 & 10 Vict. c. 86	Public Works (Ireland) (No. 2) Act 1846	An Act to extend and consolidate the Powers hitherto exercised by the Commissioners of Public Works in Ireland, and to appoint additional Commissioners.	Sections One, Three, Seven, and Ten.
9 & 10 Vict. c. 87	Baths and Washhouses (Ireland) Act 1846	An Act for promoting Voluntary Establishment in Boroughs and certain Cities and Towns in Ireland of public Baths and Wash-houses.	Section Twenty-seven.
9 & 10 Vict. c. 88	Church Patronage Act 1846	An Act to remove Doubts as to the Legality of certain Assignments of Ecclesiastical Patronage.	Section One.
9 & 10 Vict. c. 89	Turnpike Roads (Ireland) Act 1846	An Act to continue certain Acts for regulating Turnpike Roads in Ireland until the First Day of July One thousand eight hundred and forty-seven, and to the End of the then Session of Parliament.	The whole act.
9 & 10 Vict. c. 90	Still Licences Act 1846	An Act to prevent the Use of Stills by unlicensed Persons.	Section Four from "and if" to "respect;".
9 & 10 Vict. c. 93	Fatal Accidents Act 1846	An Act for compensating the Families of Persons killed by Accidents.	Section Six to "and that;". Section Seven.
9 & 10 Vict. c. 95	County Courts Act 1846	An Act for the more easy Recovery of Small Debts and Demands in England.	Section Four from "and" to end of that Section. Sections Five to Seven, Nine to Twelve, Fifteen, and Seventeen. Section Twenty from "who shall be" to "Justices", and from "who shall be" (where those words next occur) to "Three Years,". Section Twenty-three. Section Twenty-four from "and, in case" to "herein-after provided". Sections Twenty-eight and Thirty, the words "to" to "High Bailiff" (where they first occur in each Section), and the words "Clerk or" (where they last occur in each Section). Section Thirty-three from "and in case" to "Judge;". Sections Thirty-two, Thirty-five, and Thirty-eight. Section Thirty-nine, the words "to make such Order, or" and from "and in such Case" to end of that Section. Section Forty from "next before the passing of this Act;". Section Forty-one from "pay" to "Fee, and" and the subsequent word "other". Sections Forty-three, Forty-five, and Forty-seven. Section Fifty-eight from "any Judge" to "Chancery, or". Section Sixty-seven from "out" to "Fund of the Court". Section Seventy-eight to "the Courts holden under this Act; and". Section One hundred and forty-three. Schedule (D.).
9 & 10 Vict. c. 96	Nuisances Removal, etc. Act 1846	An Act the title of which begins with the words,—An Act for the more speedy Removal of certain Nuisances,—and ends with the words,—End of this then Session of Parliament.	The whole act.
9 & 10 Vict. c. 97	Constabulary (Ireland) Act 1846	An Act to provide for removing the Charge of the Constabulary Force in Ireland from Counties, and for enlarging the Reserve Force, and to make further Provision for the Regulation and Disposition of the said Constabulary Force.	Sections One and Seven.
9 & 10 Vict. c. 101	Public Money Drainage Act 1846	An Act to authorize the Advance of Public Money to a limited Amount, to promote the Improvement of Land in Great Britain and Ireland by Works of Drainage.	Sections One to Seven. Section Forty-nine from "or any" to "them,". Section Fifty.
9 & 10 Vict. c. 103	Government of New Zealand Act 1846	An Act to make further Provision for the Government of the New Zealand Islands.	Sections Nine and Seventeen. Repealed as to all Her Majesty's Dominions.
9 & 10 Vict. c. 107	Poor Employment (Ireland) Act 1846	An Act to facilitate the Employment of the labouring Poor for a limited Period in the distressed Districts in Ireland.	The whole act.
9 & 10 Vict. c. 108	Loans for Public Works (Ireland) (No. 2) Act 1846	An Act to provide additional Funds for Loans and Grants for Public Works in Ireland.	The whole act.
9 & 10 Vict. c. 111	Ejectment and Distress (Ireland) Act 1846	An Act to amend the Law in Ireland as to Ejectments and as to Distresses, and as to the Occupation of Lands.	Sections Thirteen and Twenty-five.
9 & 10 Vict. c. 112	Leases (Ireland) Act 1846	An Act to facilitate and promote the granting of certain Leases for Terms of Years in Ireland.	Section Nine.
9 & 10 Vict. c. 113	Prohibition and Mandamus (Ireland) Act 1846	An Act to improve the Proceedings in Prohibition and on Writs of Mandamus in Ireland.	Section Ten.
9 & 10 Vict. c. 114	Fisheries (Ireland) (No. 2) Act 1846	An Act for the further Amendment of an Act of the Sixth Year of Her present Majesty, for regulating the Irish Fisheries.	The whole act.
9 & 10 Vict. c. 115	Lunatic Asylums (Ireland) Act 1846	An Act the title of which begins with the words,—An Act to amend the Laws as to District Lunatic Asylums in Ireland,—and ends with the words,—Salaries and Expenses incident to the Office of Inspector of Lunatics in Ireland.	The whole act. (Note: This act was partially revived by the Statute Law Revision Act 1878 (41 & 42 Vict. c. 79): "Section Two, except so much thereof as was repealed by 18 & 19 Vict. c. 109. s. 4. Section Three.")
9 & 10 Vict. c. 116	Appropriation Act 1846	An Act the title of which begins with the words,—An Act to apply the Sum,—and ends with the words,—and to appropriate the Supplies granted in this Session of Parliament.	The whole act.
10 & 11 Vict. c. 1	Public Works (Ireland) (No. 1) Act 1846	An Act to suspend, until the First Day of September One thousand eight hundred and forty-seven, the Duties on the Importation of Corn.	The whole act.
10 & 11 Vict. c. 2	Importation Act 1847	An Act to allow, until the First Day of September One thousand eight hundred and forty-seven, the Importation of Corn from Foreign Ships.	The whole act.
10 & 11 Vict. c. 3	Duties on Buckwheat, etc. Act 1847	An Act to suspend until the First Day of September One thousand eight hundred and forty-seven, the Duties on the Importation of Buck Wheat, Beer or Bigg, Wheat, Maize or Indian Corn, Barley, Rye, Oats, and Pease.	The whole act.
10 & 11 Vict. c. 4	Chelsea Pensions (Abolition of Poundage) Act 1847	An Act for abolishing Poundage on Chelsea Pensions.	Section One to "repealed;" and ", from" and from "Provided" to end of that Section. Section Two.
10 & 11 Vict. c. 5	Sugar in Brewing Act 1847	An Act to allow the Use of Sugar in the brewing of Beer.	Section Six. Section Eight to "this Act". Section Nine.
10 & 11 Vict. c. 7	Temporary Relief Act 1847	An Act for the temporary Relief of destitute Persons in Ireland.	The whole act.
10 & 11 Vict. c. 8	Supply Act 1847	An Act to apply the Sum of Eight Millions out of the Consolidated Fund to the Service of the Year One thousand eight hundred and forty-seven.	The whole act.
10 & 11 Vict. c. 10	Poor Relief (Ireland) (No. 1) Act 1847	An Act to render valid certain Proceedings for the Relief of Distress in Ireland, by Employment of the Labouring Poor, and to indemnify those who have acted in such Proceedings.	The whole act.
10 & 11 Vict. c. 11	Public Money Drainage Act 1847	An Act to explain and amend the Acts authorizing the Advance of Money for the Improvement of Land by Drainage in Great Britain.	Section Twelve.
10 & 11 Vict. c. 12	Mutiny Act 1847	An Act for punishing Mutiny and Desertion, and for the better Payment of the Army and their Quarters.	The whole act.
10 & 11 Vict. c. 13	Marine Mutiny Act 1847	An Act for the Regulation of Her Majesty's Royal Marine Forces while on shore.	The whole act.
10 & 11 Vict. c. 14	Markets and Fairs Clauses Act 1847	An Act for consolidating in One Act certain Provisions usually contained in Acts for constructing or regulating Markets and Fairs.	Sections Fifty-three and Sixty.
10 & 11 Vict. c. 15	Gasworks Clauses Act 1847	An Act for consolidating in One Act certain Provisions usually contained in Acts authorizing the making of Gasworks for supplying Towns with Gas.	Sections Fourteen and Fifteen. Section Sixteen from "and recover" to end of that Section. Sections Seventeen, Forty-one, and Fifty. Repealed so far as inconsistent with special Acts to which 34 & 35 Vict. c. 41. does not apply. But this exception not to apply to Sections Forty-one and Fifty.
10 & 11 Vict. c. 16	Commissioners Clauses Act 1847	An Act for consolidating in One Act certain Provisions usually contained in Acts with respect to the Constitution and Regulation of Bodies of Commissioners appointed for carrying on Undertakings of a public Nature.	Section One hundred and two, the words "of Insolvency", from "or under" to "Discharge" (wherever they occur), and the words "or of an Act of Insolvency". Sections One hundred and seven and One hundred and thirteen.
10 & 11 Vict. c. 17	Waterworks Clauses Act 1847	An Act for consolidating in One Act certain Provisions usually contained in Acts authorizing the making of Waterworks for supplying Towns with Water.	Sections Fifty-five and Fifty-nine, so far as they relate to special Acts with which 26 & 27 Vict. c. 93. is incorporated. Sections Eighty-six and Ninety-four.
10 & 11 Vict. c. 19	Exchequer Bills Act 1847	An Act for raising the Sum of Eighteen millions three hundred and ten thousand seven hundred Pounds by Exchequer Bills, for the Service of the Year one thousand eight hundred and forty-seven.	The whole act.
10 & 11 Vict. c. 20	General Register House, Edinburgh Act 1847	An Act to authorize the Application of certain Sums received on account of the Fees payable to the Office of Director in Chancery in Scotland towards the Payment of Debts incurred in completing the General Register House at Edinburgh.	The whole act.
10 & 11 Vict. c. 21	Parliamentary Elections (Soldiers) Act 1847	An Act to regulate the Stations of Soldiers during Parliamentary Elections.	Sections One and Five.
10 & 11 Vict. c. 22	Fever (Ireland) Act 1847	An Act to amend, and continue until the First Day of November One thousand eight hundred and forty-seven, and to the End of the then next Session of Parliament, an Act for making Provision for the Treatment of poor Persons afflicted with Fever in Ireland.	The whole act.
10 & 11 Vict. c. 26	Land for Prisons (Ireland) Act 1847	An Act for enabling the Commissioners of Public Works in Ireland to purchase Land for Prisons in Ireland.	Section Eight.
10 & 11 Vict. c. 27	Harbours, Docks, and Piers Clauses Act 1847	An Act for consolidating in One Act certain Provisions usually contained in Acts authorizing the making and improving of Harbours, Docks, and Piers.	Sections Ninety-three and One hundred and four.
10 & 11 Vict. c. 28	County Buildings Act 1847	An Act to amend the Acts relating to County Buildings.	Section Two.
10 & 11 Vict. c. 31	Poor Relief (Ireland) Act 1847	An Act to make further Provision for the Relief of the destitute Poor in Ireland.	Section Five. Section Twenty-nine to "thereof". Section Thirty-one.
10 & 11 Vict. c. 32	Landed Property Improvement (Ireland) Act 1847	An Act to facilitate the Improvement of Landed Property in Ireland.	Sections One, Two, Twelve, and Sixty-seven.
10 & 11 Vict. c. 33	Poor Removal Act 1847	An Act to amend the Laws relating to the Removal of poor Persons from England and Scotland.	Section Five.
10 & 11 Vict. c. 34	Towns Improvement Clauses Act 1847	An Act for consolidating in One Act certain Provisions usually contained in Acts for paving, draining, cleansing, lighting and improving Towns.	Sections Two hundred and eleven and Two hundred and nineteen.
10 & 11 Vict. c. 35	Turnpike Roads (Ireland) Act 1847	An Act to continue until the Thirty-first Day of July One thousand eight hundred and forty-eight, and to the End of the then next Session of Parliament, certain Acts for regulating Turnpike Roads in Ireland.	The whole act.
10 & 11 Vict. c. 36	Subscriptions to Loan Act 1847	An Act for allowing the Subventions to the Loss of Mails read in the Year One thousand eight hundred and forty-seven to be paid under Discount.	The whole act.
10 & 11 Vict. c. 38	Land Drainage Act 1847	An Act to facilitate the Drainage of Lands in England and Wales.	Section Twenty-one.
10 & 11 Vict. c. 39	Burgh Police, etc. (Scotland) Act 1847	An Act to amend an Act to enable Burghs in Scotland to establish a general System of Police, and another Act for providing for the Appointment and Election of Magistrates and Councillors for certain Burghs and Towns of Scotland.	Section Nine.
10 & 11 Vict. c. 40	Lunatic Asylum (Ireland) Act 1847	An Act the title of which begins with the words,—An Act to continue until the Thirty-first Day of July,—and ends with the words,—amending the Law relative to private Lunatic Asylums in Ireland.	The whole act.
10 & 11 Vict. c. 41	Soap Duties Allowances Act 1847	An Act to continue until the Thirty-first Day of July One thousand eight hundred and forty-eight, and to the End of the then next Session of Parliament, certain of the Allowances of the Duty of Excise on Soap used in Manufactures.	The whole act.
10 & 11 Vict. c. 42	Railway Passenger Duty Act 1847	An Act to transfer the Collection and Management of the Duties in respect of Stage Carriages, Hackney Carriages, and Railway Passengers from the Commissioners of Stamps and Taxes to the Commissioners of Excise.	Section One to "and forty-seven", from "for and in respect of Stage" to "employing Stage Carriages", and from "and" and also" to "London". Section Two from "September" from "or any of them" to "such Carriages," (where those words first occur), from "or to Stage" to "such Carriages," and from "and to Stage" to "Conductors respectively;". Sections Three to Six.
10 & 11 Vict. c. 44	Government of Newfoundland Act 1847	An Act to render permanent certain Parts of the Act for amending the Constitution of the Government of Newfoundland.	Repealed as to all Her Majesty's Dominions.
10 & 11 Vict. c. 46	Prisoners Removal (Ireland) Act 1847	An Act to facilitate the voluntary Investment of Trust Money in the Improvement of Landed Property in Ireland.	Section Eight.
10 & 11 Vict. c. 53	Loan Societies Act 1847	An Act to continue until the First Day of October One thousand eight hundred and forty-eight, and to the End of the then next Session of Parliament, an Act to amend the Laws relating to Loan Societies.	The whole act.
10 & 11 Vict. c. 55	Poor Relief (Ireland) (No. 3) Act 1847	An Act to authorize a further Advance of Money for the Relief of destitute Persons in Ireland.	The whole act.
10 & 11 Vict. c. 56	Port Natal Act 1847	An Act to make legal certain Duties at Port Natal.	Repealed as to all Her Majesty's Dominions.
10 & 11 Vict. c. 60	Masters in Chancery Act 1847	An Act to abolish One of the Offices of Master in Ordinary of the High Court of Chancery.	The whole act.
10 & 11 Vict. c. 61	Baths and Washhouses Act 1847	An Act to extend into Ireland the Act for the Establishment of public Baths and Washhouses.	Section Three to "Adoption; and". Sections Six and Eight.
10 & 11 Vict. c. 62	Naval Deserters Act 1847	An Act for the Establishment of Naval Prisons, and for the Prevention of Desertion from Her Majesty's Navy.	Section Nine from "or in the Territories" to "Company". Section Ten from "or the Forces" to "Company". Section Seventeen.
10 & 11 Vict. c. 63	Royal Marines Act 1847	An Act for limiting the Time of Service in the Royal Marine Forces.	Section Two to "and that". Section Three from "for the" to "Years". Section Four from "for such Period" to "Years". Section Eight. Schedule (B.) from "[to be" to "Twenty-four Years]".
10 & 11 Vict. c. 64	Duties on Corn, etc. Act 1847	An Act to suspend until the First Day of March One thousand eight hundred and forty-eight the Duties on the Importation of Corn, Maize, Rice, Grain, Meal, Flour, Biscuit, and certain other similar Articles.	The whole act.
10 & 11 Vict. c. 65	Cemeteries Clauses Act 1847	An Act for consolidating in One Act certain Provisions usually contained in Acts authorizing the making of Cemeteries.	Sections Sixty-three and Sixty-nine.
10 & 11 Vict. c. 67	Transportation Act 1847	An Act to amend the Law as to the Custody of Offenders.	Section Three.
10 & 11 Vict. c. 68	Militia Ballots Suspension Act 1847	An Act to suspend until the First Day of October One thousand eight hundred and forty-eight the making of Lists and the Ballots and Enrolments for the Militia of the United Kingdom.	The whole act.
10 & 11 Vict. c. 69	House of Commons Costs Taxation Act 1847	An Act for the more effectual Taxation of Costs on Private Bills in the House of Commons.	Sections One and Twelve.
10 & 11 Vict. c. 71	Canada Civil List Act 1847	An Act the title of which begins with the words,—An Act to authorize Her Majesty to assent to a certain Bill,—and ends with the words,—Lower Canada, and for the Government of Canada.	Repealed as to all Her Majesty's Dominions.
10 & 11 Vict. c. 72	South Wales Turnpike Roads Act 1847	An Act for the further Amendment of the Laws relating to Turnpike Roads in South Wales.	Section One from "so much" to "repealed; and". Section Eight, Fourteen, and Seventeen.
10 & 11 Vict. c. 73	Advances for Railways (Ireland) Act 1847	An Act to authorize the Advance of Money out of the Consolidated Fund for Loans towards defraying the Expense of making certain Railways in Ireland.	The whole act.
10 & 11 Vict. c. 74	Shannon Navigation Act 1847	An Act to provide for the Repayment of Sums due by the County of the City of Limerick for Money for the Improvement of the Navigation of the River Shannon.	The whole act.
10 & 11 Vict. c. 75	Piers and Harbours (Ireland) Act 1847	An Act for the Improvement of the Fishery Piers and Harbours of Ireland.	The whole act.
10 & 11 Vict. c. 77	Poor Rates Act 1847	An Act the title of which begins with the words,—An Act to continue until the First Day of October,—and ends with the words,—Liability to be rated as such in respect of Stock in Trade or other Property to the Relief of the Poor.	The whole act.
10 & 11 Vict. c. 79	Drainage (Ireland) Act 1847	An Act to continue for a limited Time the Provisions for summary Proceedings contained in an Act of the last Session to amend the Acts for promoting the Drainage of Lands, and for other Purposes, and to amend the said Act.	Sections One and Six.
10 & 11 Vict. c. 80	Employment of Poor, etc. (Ireland) Act 1847	An Act to amend an Act of the last Session, for facilitating the Employment of the labouring Poor in the distressed Districts in Ireland, so far as relates to Compensation for Damages.	Section Twelve to "Forfeitures, but". Section Thirteen.
10 & 11 Vict. c. 84	Vagrancy (Ireland) Act 1847	An Act to make Provision for the Punishment of Vagrants and Persons offending against the Laws in force for the Relief of the destitute Poor in Ireland.	Sections One and Nine.
10 & 11 Vict. c. 85	Post Office (Duties) Act 1847	An Act for giving further Facilities for the Transmission of Letters by Post, and for the regulating the Duties of Postage thereon, and for other Purposes relating to the Post Office.	Section One, the words "to and that" and the subsequent words "or any three of them,". Sections Twenty-two and Twenty-two.
10 & 11 Vict. c. 86	Importation Act 1847	An Act to allow until the First Day of March One thousand eight hundred and forty-eight, the Importation of Corn, Maize, Rice, Grain, Potatoes, Meal, Flour, Biscuit, and certain other similar Articles, from any Country.	The whole act.
10 & 11 Vict. c. 87	Employment of Poor Act 1847	An Act to facilitate the Recovery of Public Monies advanced for the Relief of Distress in Ireland by the Employment of the labouring Poor.	The whole act.
10 & 11 Vict. c. 88	Militia Pay Act 1847	An Act the title of which begins with the words,—An Act to defray until the First Day of August One thousand eight hundred and forty-eight the Charge of the Pay,—and ends with the words,—Militia; and to authorize the Employment of the Non-commissioned Officers.	The whole act.
10 & 11 Vict. c. 89	Town Police Clauses Act 1847	An Act to consolidate in One Act certain Provisions usually contained in Acts for regulating the Police of Towns.	Sections Seventy-four and Seventy-nine.
10 & 11 Vict. c. 90	Poor Relief (Ireland) (No. 2) Act 1847	An Act to provide for the Execution of the Laws for the Relief of the Poor in Ireland.	Sections One to Six and Eight. Section Nine from "Provided always" to end of that Section. Section Ten to "Successors of the said Poor Law Commissioners;". Sections Thirteen and Eighteen. Section Twenty-one to "Proceedings;". Sections Twenty-two, Twenty-three, and Twenty-five.
10 & 11 Vict. c. 91	Manufactures Improvement Fund (Scotland) Act 1847	An Act to increase the Number of Trustees for the Herring Fishery, and to direct the Application of the Funds granted for the Promotion of Manufactures and Improvements, in Scotland.	Section Five.
10 & 11 Vict. c. 92	Mussel Fisheries (Scotland) Act 1847	An Act for the Protection of Mussel Fisheries in Scotland.	Section Five.
10 & 11 Vict. c. 93	Highway Rates Act 1847	An Act to continue until the First Day of October One thousand eight hundred and forty-eight, and to the End of the then next Session of Parliament, an Act for authorizing the Application of Highway Rates to Turnpike Roads.	The whole act.
10 & 11 Vict. c. 94	Canal (Carriers) Act 1847	An Act to amend an Act to enable Canal Companies to become Carriers upon their Canals.	Section Five.
10 & 11 Vict. c. 95	Colonial Copyright Act 1847	An Act to amend the Law relating to the Protection in the Colonies of Works entitled to Copyright in the United Kingdom.	Section Three.
10 & 11 Vict. c. 96	Trustees Relief Act 1847	An Act for better securing Trust Funds, and for the Relief of Trustees.	Section One from "or of the East" to "Sea Company,". Section Six.
10 & 11 Vict. c. 97	Masters in Chancery (No. 2) Act 1847	An Act for the Discontinuance of the Attendance of the Masters in Ordinary of the High Court of Chancery in the Public Office, and for transferring the Business of such Public Office to the Affidavit Office in Chancery.	The whole act.
10 & 11 Vict. c. 98	Ecclesiastical Jurisdiction Act 1847	An Act to amend the Law as to Ecclesiastical Jurisdiction in England.	Section One from "save" to "Intestates;". Sections Three, Four, Six to Eight, and Ten.
10 & 11 Vict. c. 99	Poor Relief (Ireland) (No. 4) Act 1847	An Act to authorize a further Advance of Money for the Relief of destitute Persons in Ireland.	The whole act.
10 & 11 Vict. c. 100	Irish Constabulary Act 1847	An Act to regulate the Superannuation Allowances of the Constabulary Force in Ireland and the Dublin Metropolitan Police.	Sections One, Two, Seven, Nine, and Eleven.
10 & 11 Vict. c. 101	Copyhold Commission Act 1847	An Act to continue the Copyhold Commission until the First Day of October One thousand eight hundred and fifty, and to the End of the then next Session of Parliament.	The whole act.
10 & 11 Vict. c. 104	Tithe Act 1847	An Act to explain the Acts for the Commutation of Tithes in England and Wales, and to continue the Officers appointed under the said Acts until the First Day of October One thousand eight hundred and fifty, and to the End of the then next Session of Parliament.	Sections One and Five.
10 & 11 Vict. c. 105	Turnpike Acts (Great Britain) Act 1847	An Act to continue until the First Day of October One thousand eight hundred and fifty, and to the End of the then next Session of Parliament, certain Turnpike Acts.	The whole act.
10 & 11 Vict. c. 106	Drainage, etc. (Ireland) Act 1847	An Act to provide additional Funds for Loans for Drainage and other Works of public Utility in Ireland, and to repeal an Act relating thereto, and for authorizing a further Issue of Money in aid of Public Works of acknowledged Utility.	The whole act.
10 & 11 Vict. c. 107	Appropriation Act 1847	An Act to apply a Sum out of the Consolidated Fund, and certain other Sums, to the Service of the Year One thousand eight hundred and forty-seven; and to appropriate the Supplies granted in this Session of Parliament.	The whole act.
10 & 11 Vict. c. 108	Ecclesiastical Commissioners Act 1847	An Act for establishing the Bishoprick of Manchester, and amending certain Acts relating to the Ecclesiastical Commissioners for England.	Section One from "and" to "and that". Section Three.
10 & 11 Vict. c. 109	Poor Law Board Act 1847	An Act for the Administration of the Laws for Relief of the Poor in England.	Section One to "administering the Laws for Poor in England; and" and the subsequent word "said". Sections Two to Four and Six to Nine. Section Ten to "enter on their Office", from "and by the Commissioners" to "of the next," and from "and at the" to end of that Section. Section Twelve. Section Fourteen to "enter on their Office", from "to be" to "specified," and from "and shall" to end of that Section. Section Sixteen and Eighteen. Section Twenty-two to "and that". Sections Twenty-seven and Thirty.
10 & 11 Vict. c. 110	Poor Removal (No. 2) Act 1847	An Act to amend the Laws relating to the Removal of the Poor, until the First Day of October One thousand eight hundred and forty-eight.	The whole act.
10 & 11 Vict. c. 111	Inclosure Act 1847	An Act to extend the Provisions of the Act for the Inclosure and Improvement of Commons.	Section Five, the words "the said recited Act is repealed; and that". Section Ten.
10 & 11 Vict. c. 112	New Zealand Act 1847	An Act to promote Colonization in New Zealand, and to authorize a Loan to the New Zealand Company.	Except Section Nineteen. Repealed as to all Her Majesty's Dominions.
10 & 11 Vict. c. 113	Land Drainage (Scotland) Act 1847	An Act to facilitate the Drainage of Lands in Scotland.	Section Eighteen.
11 & 12 Vict. c. 1	Public Works (Ireland) Act 1848	An Act to facilitate the Completion, in certain Cases, of Public Works in Ireland.	The whole act.
11 & 12 Vict. c. 2	Government of New Zealand Act 1848	An Act for the better Prevention of Crime and Outrage in certain Parts of Ireland until the First Day of December One thousand eight hundred and forty-nine, and to the End of the then next Session of Parliament.	Sections Sixteen to Twenty, Twenty-two, and Twenty-three.
11 & 12 Vict. c. 3	Railways Act 1848	An Act to give further Time for executing certain Railways.	The whole act.
11 & 12 Vict. c. 4	Supply Act 1848	An Act to apply the Sum of Eight Millions out of the Consolidated Fund to the Service of the Year One thousand eight hundred and forty-eight.	The whole act.
11 & 12 Vict. c. 7	Queen's Prison Act 1848	An Act to amend an Act for consolidating the Queen's Bench, Fleet, and Marshalsea Prison, and for regulating the Queen's Prison.	The whole act.
11 & 12 Vict. c. 8	Income Tax Act 1848	An Act to continue for Three Years the Duties on Profits arising from Property, Professions, Trades, and Offices.	The whole act.
11 & 12 Vict. c. 9	Stamp Duties Act 1848	An Act to continue for Three Years the Stamp Duties granted by an Act of the Fifth and Sixth Years of Her present Majesty, to assimilate the Stamp Duties in Great Britain and Ireland, and to make Regulations for collecting and managing the same.	The whole act.
11 & 12 Vict. c. 10	Court of Chancery Act 1848	An Act for empowering certain Officers of the High Court of Chancery to administer Oaths and take Declarations and Affirmations.	Section Two. Section Three from "or Clerk of Affidavits" to "Affidavits,". Sections Four to Six.
11 & 12 Vict. c. 11	Mutiny Act 1848	An Act for punishing Mutiny and Desertion, and for the better Payment of the Army and their Quarters.	The whole act.
11 & 12 Vict. c. 12	Treason Felony Act 1848	An Act for the better Security of the Crown and Government of the United Kingdom.	Sections One and Eleven.
11 & 12 Vict. c. 13	Mining Leases (Ireland) Act 1848	An Act for amending the Law for the leasing of Mines in Ireland.	Section One from "That from" to "repealed; and". Section Four.
11 & 12 Vict. c. 15	Marine Mutiny Act 1848	An Act for the Regulation of Her Majesty's Royal Marine Forces while on shore.	The whole act.
11 & 12 Vict. c. 16	Exchequer Bills Act 1848	An Act for raising the Sum of Seventeen millions nine hundred and forty-six thousand five hundred Pounds by Exchequer Bills, for the Service of the Year One thousand eight hundred and forty-eight.	The whole act.
11 & 12 Vict. c. 17	Public Works (Ireland) Act 1848	An Act to extend the Act of the present Session to facilitate the Completion of Public Works in Ireland.	The whole act.
11 & 12 Vict. c. 18	Election Recognizances Act 1848	An Act to remove certain Doubts as to the Law for the trial of controverted Elections.	The whole act.
11 & 12 Vict. c. 20	Aliens Act 1848	An Act to authorize for One Year, and to the End of the then next Session of Parliament, the Removal of Aliens from the Realm.	The whole act.
11 & 12 Vict. c. 21	Indian Insolvency Act 1848	An Act to consolidate and amend the Laws relating to Insolvent Debtors in India.	Section One. Section Seven from "and until" to end of that Section. Section Sixteen. Section Forty-two and Sixty-five to Sixty-seven. Section Sixty-eight, the words "Master or". Section Eighty-eight from "and that" to end of that Section. Section Eighty-nine from "by the Recorder" to "Malacca", and from "from Time to Time to establish" to "practise in the said Court for the Relief of Insolvent Debtors, and". Section Ninety-three. Repealed as to all Her Majesty's Dominions.
11 & 12 Vict. c. 22	Islands of Tobago, etc. Act 1848	An Act for granting Relief to the Island of Tobago, and for aiding the Colonies of British Guiana and Trinidad in raising Money for the Promotion of Immigration of free Labourers.	The whole act.
11 & 12 Vict. c. 24	Disfranchisement of Freemen, Great Yarmouth Act 1848	An Act for disfranchising the Freemen of the Borough of Great Yarmouth.	The whole act.
11 & 12 Vict. c. 25	Poor Relief (Ireland) Act 1848	An Act to extend the Powers given by former Acts for purchasing or hiring Land and Buildings for or for the Use of Workhouses in Ireland, and for providing for the Burial of the Poor.	Section Two from "so much" to "lieu thereof". Section Five.
11 & 12 Vict. c. 26	Grand Jury Cess (Ireland) Act 1848	An Act the title of which begins with the words,—An Act to remove Difficulties in the Appointment of Collectors of Grand Jury Cess,—and ends with the words,—Poor Rates, and other Cases.	Sections Four and Nine.
11 & 12 Vict. c. 28	Execution (Ireland) Act 1848	An Act to amend the Law of Imprisonment for Debt in Ireland, and to improve the Remedies for the recovery of Debts and of the Possession of Tenements situate in Cities and Towns in Ireland.	Section Two. Section Three to "such Remedy and Execution". Sections Twenty and Twenty-one.
11 & 12 Vict. c. 29	Hares Act 1848	An Act to enable Persons having a Right to kill Hares in England and Wales to do so by themselves or Persons authorized by them, without being required to take out a Game Certificate.	Section One from "without the Payment of any" to "refusal, and". Section Two from "which Book" to "District;". Section Nine.
11 & 12 Vict. c. 30	Hares (Scotland) Act 1848	An Act to enable all Persons having at present a Right to kill Hares in Scotland to do so by themselves or Persons authorized by them, without being required to take out a Game Certificate.	Section Seven.
11 & 12 Vict. c. 31	Poor Law Procedure Act 1848	An Act to amend the Procedure in respect of Orders for the Removal of the Poor in England and Wales, and Appeals therefrom.	Sections One, Seven, and Thirteen.
11 & 12 Vict. c. 32	County Cess (Ireland) Act 1848	An Act to facilitate the Collection of County Cess in Ireland.	Section Four.
11 & 12 Vict. c. 33	Supply (No. 2) Act 1848	An Act to apply the Sum of Three Millions out of the Consolidated Fund to the Service of the Year One thousand eight hundred and forty-eight.	The whole act.
11 & 12 Vict. c. 35	Habeas Corpus Suspension (Ireland) Act 1848	An Act the title of which begins with the words,—An Act to empower the Lord Lieutenant,—and ends with the words,—conspiring against Her Majesty's Person and Government.	The whole act.
11 & 12 Vict. c. 36	Entail Amendment Act 1848	An Act for the Amendment of the Law of Entail in Scotland.	Section Thirty-four from "and shall also" to end of that Section. Sections Forty-six and Fifty-three.
11 & 12 Vict. c. 38	West India Loans Act 1848	An Act to authorize the West India Relief Commissioners to grant further Time for the Repayment of Monies advanced by them in certain Cases.	Section Seven.
11 & 12 Vict. c. 42	Indictable Offences Act 1848	An Act to facilitate the Performance of the Duties of Justices of the Peace out of Sessions within England and Wales with respect to Persons charged with indictable Offences.	Section Thirteen from "Provided also" to end of that Section. Sections Thirty-three to Thirty-five. Schedule (S. 1.) so far as it relates to the condition where the defendant is entitled to a Traverse.
11 & 12 Vict. c. 43	Summary Jurisdiction Act 1848	An Act to facilitate the Performance of the Duties of Justices of the Peace out of Sessions, within England and Wales, with respect to summary Convictions and Orders.	Sections Thirty-six, Thirty-eight, and Thirty-nine.
11 & 12 Vict. c. 44	Justices Protection Act 1848	An Act to protect Justices of the Peace from vexatious Actions for Acts done by them in execution of their Office.	Sections Sixteen, Seventeen, and Nineteen.
11 & 12 Vict. c. 46	Criminal Procedure Act 1848	An Act for the Removal of Defects in the Administration of Criminal Justice.	Section Six.
11 & 12 Vict. c. 47	Eviction (Ireland) Act 1848	An Act for the Protection and Relief of the destitute Poor evicted from their Dwellings in Ireland.	Section Ten.
11 & 12 Vict. c. 48	Incumbered Estates (Ireland) Act 1848	An Act to facilitate the Sale of Incumbered Estates in Ireland.	Section Fifty-one. Section Seventy-five from "and may" to end of that Section.
11 & 12 Vict. c. 49	Sale of Beer, etc. on Sunday Act 1848	An Act for regulating the Sale of Beer and other Liquors on the Lord's Day.	The whole act.
11 & 12 Vict. c. 51	Public Works (Ireland) Act 1848	An Act to provide additional Funds for Loans for Drainage and other Works of public Utility in Ireland.	The whole act.
11 & 12 Vict. c. 55	Paymaster General Act 1848	An Act for consolidating the Offices of Paymasters of Exchequer Bills and Paymaster of Civil Services with the Office of Paymaster General, and for making other Provisions in regard to the consolidated Offices.	Section Eight from "and the said" to end of that Section. Section Ten.
11 & 12 Vict. c. 58	Naval Medical Supplement Fund Society Act 1848	An Act to authorize for Ten Years, and to the End of the then next Session of Parliament, the Regulation of the Annuities and Premiums of the Naval Medical Supplemental Fund Society.	The whole act.
11 & 12 Vict. c. 64	Loan Societies Act 1848	An Act to continue until the First Day of October One thousand eight hundred and forty-nine, and to the End of the then next Session of Parliament, an Act to amend the Laws relating to Loan Societies.	The whole act.
11 & 12 Vict. c. 65	Militia Ballots Suspension Act 1848	An Act to suspend until the First Day of October One thousand eight hundred and forty-nine the making of Lists and the Ballots and Enrolments for the Militia of the United Kingdom.	The whole act.
11 & 12 Vict. c. 66	Highway Rates Act 1848	An Act to continue to the First Day of October One thousand eight hundred and forty-nine, and to the End of the then next Session of Parliament, an Act for authorizing the Application of Highway Rates to Turnpike Roads.	The whole act.
11 & 12 Vict. c. 67	Ecclesiastical Jurisdiction Act 1848	An Act for further continuing until the First Day of August One thousand eight hundred and forty-nine, and to the End of the then next Session of Parliament, certain temporary Provisions concerning Ecclesiastical Jurisdiction in England.	The whole act.
11 & 12 Vict. c. 68	Trustees Relief (Ireland) Act 1848	An Act for extending to Ireland an Act passed in the last Session of Parliament, intituled An Act for better securing Trust Funds, and for the Relief of Trustees.	Sections Five and Eight. The rest of this Act so far as it relates to the Court of Exchequer.
11 & 12 Vict. c. 69	Malicious Injuries (Ireland) Act 1848	An Act the title of which begins with the words,—An Act to repeal so much of an Act of the Parliament of Ireland,—and ends with the words,—Remedies against any Hundreds or Baronies in Ireland in respect of Robbery.	Sections One, Three, Four, and Six.
11 & 12 Vict. c. 70	Fines and Recoveries Act 1848	An Act for dispensing with the Evidence of the Proclamations on Fines levied in the Court of Common Pleas at Westminster.	The whole act.
11 & 12 Vict. c. 71	Church Building Commission Act 1848	An Act to continue to the Twentieth Day of July One thousand eight hundred and fifty-five, and to the End of the then next Session of Parliament, Her Majesty's Commission for building new Churches.	The whole act.
11 & 12 Vict. c. 72	Constabulary (Ireland) Act 1848	An Act to amend the Acts relating to the Constabulary Force in Ireland, and to amend the Provisions for the Payment of Special Constables.	Sections One and Two. Section Six, the words "at and after the Rates herein-before specified". Section Seven from "and also" to "Constables,". Section Sixteen. Schedule (A.).
11 & 12 Vict. c. 73	Turnpike Acts (Ireland) Act 1848	An Act to continue until the Thirty-first Day of July One thousand eight hundred and forty-nine, and to the End of the then Session of Parliament, certain Acts for regulating Turnpike Roads in Ireland.	The whole act.
11 & 12 Vict. c. 74	Registers of Sasines (Scotland) Act 1848	An Act to authorize the Lords of Council and Session to regulate the Rates and Form of Registration to be charged by the Keepers of the Registers of Sasines, Reversions, &c. in Scotland.	Section Three.
11 & 12 Vict. c. 75	Militia Pay Act 1848	An Act the title of which begins with the words,—An Act to defray until the First Day of August One thousand eight hundred and forty-nine the Charge of the Pay,—and ends with the words,—Militia; and to authorize the Employment of the Non-commissioned Officers.	The whole act.
11 & 12 Vict. c. 78	Crown Cases Act 1848	An Act for the further Amendment and better Administration of the Criminal Law.	Section Eight. And from the commencement of the "Supreme Court of Judicature Act, 1873,"— Section Three to "Place and" so far as it relates to England.
11 & 12 Vict. c. 79	Justiciary (Scotland) Act 1848	An Act to facilitate Summary Procedure in the High Court of Justiciary in Scotland.	Sections Eight and Thirteen.
11 & 12 Vict. c. 80	Tithe Rentcharge (Ireland) Act 1848	An Act the title of which begins with the words,—An Act to empower Lessees of Tithe Rent-charge in Ireland to deduct a Proportion of Poor Rate Poundage from Rent,—and ends with the words,—certain Tax thereby imposed upon such Property in Ireland.	Section Four.
11 & 12 Vict. c. 83	Assessionable Manors Award Act 1848	An Act to confirm the Awards of Assessionable Manors Commissioners, and for other Purposes relating to the Duchies of Cornwall and Lancaster.	Sections Three and Sixteen.
11 & 12 Vict. c. 85	Poor Rates Act 1848	An Act the title of which begins with the words,—An Act to continue to the First Day of October,—and ends with the words,—Stock in Trade or other Property to the Relief of the Poor.	The whole act.
11 & 12 Vict. c. 87	Debts Recovery Act 1848	An Act to extend the Provisions of an Act passed in the First Year of His late Majesty King William the Fourth, intituled An Act for amending and consolidating the Laws for facilitating the Payment of Debts out of Real Estate.	Section Two.
11 & 12 Vict. c. 88	Post Office (Money Orders) Act 1848	An Act for further regulating the Money Order Department of the Post Office.	Section One. Section Six, the words "or any Three of them" (wherever they occur). Section Nine.
11 & 12 Vict. c. 89	Unlawful Combinations (Ireland) Act 1848	An Act the title of which begins with the words,—An Act to continue for Two Years,—and ends with the words,—preventing the administering and taking unlawful Oaths in Ireland.	Sections One and Three.
11 & 12 Vict. c. 90	Parliamentary Elections Act 1848	An Act to regulate the Times of Payment of Rates and Taxes by Parliamentary Electors.	From "after" to "forty-nine".
11 & 12 Vict. c. 91	Poor Law Audit Act 1848	An Act to make Provision for the Payment of Parish Debts, the Audit of Parochial and Union Accounts, and the Allowance of certain Charges therein.	Section Two, the words "have been commenced or". Section Three. Section Six from "any Authority" to "Payment". Section Twelve from "and all Relief" to "same was granted out of the Workhouse:" and the subsequent words "given", "heretofore or hereafter", "is now or", and "hereafter".
11 & 12 Vict. c. 92	Fisheries (Ireland) Act 1848	An Act for the Protection and Improvement of the Salmon, Trout, and other Inland Fisheries of Ireland.	Section Two. Section Three to "Maps; and". Sections Twenty-two, Twenty-seven, and Thirty-five, so far as they relate to application of fines, penalties, and forfeitures. Section Forty.
11 & 12 Vict. c. 96	Turnpike Acts Continuance Act 1848	An Act to continue certain Turnpike Acts for limited Periods.	The whole act.
11 & 12 Vict. c. 99	Inclosure Act 1848	An Act to further extend the Provisions of the Act for the Inclosure and Improvement of Commons.	Section One, the words "to sanction an Inclosure, or". Section Fifteen.
11 & 12 Vict. c. 101	Lock-up Houses Act 1848	An Act to provide for the Expenses of erecting and maintaining Lock-up Houses on the Borders of Counties.	Section Eight.
11 & 12 Vict. c. 102	Crown Lands Act 1848	An Act the title of which begins with the words,—An Act to enlarge the Powers of an Act,—and ends with the words,—improving the Accounts of the Commissioners of Her Majesty's Woods.	Sections One to Five. Section Six to "confirmed; and". Section Eight from "except" to "provided;". Section Nine, the words "or any Three or more of them," (wherever they occur). Section Ten, the words "or any Three of them,". Section Twelve.
11 & 12 Vict. c. 103	Army Prize Money Act 1848	An Act to authorize the Application of a Sum of Money out of the forfeited and unclaimed Army Prize Fund in purchasing the Site of a Military Asylum, and in improving such Asylum.	Section Two.
11 & 12 Vict. c. 104	Millbank Prison Act 1848	An Act for amending the Act for regulating the Prison at Millbank.	Section One to "Stead, and" and the words "or by Two" (wherever they occur). Sections Two and Three.
11 & 12 Vict. c. 105	Importation of Sheep Act 1848	An Act to prohibit the Importation of Sheep, Cattle, or other Animals, for the Purpose of preventing the Introduction of contagious or infectious Disorders.	Section Six.
11 & 12 Vict. c. 106	Labouring Poor (Ireland) Act 1848	An Act to continue, until the Tenth Year of Her present Majesty is rendering valid certain Proceedings for the Relief of Distress in Ireland by Employment of the labouring Poor, and to indemnify those who have acted in such Proceedings.	The whole act.
11 & 12 Vict. c. 107	Contagious Disorders (Sheep), etc. Act 1848	An Act to prevent, until the First Day of September One thousand eight hundred and fifty, and to the End of the then Session of Parliament, the spreading of contagious or infectious Disorders among Sheep, Cattle, and other Animals.	Sections Thirteen, Twenty, and Twenty-two.
11 & 12 Vict. c. 108	Diplomatic Relations with See of Rome Act 1848	An Act for enabling Her Majesty to establish and maintain Diplomatic Relations with the Sovereign of the Roman States.	The whole act.
11 & 12 Vict. c. 110	Poor Law Amendment Act 1848	An Act to alter the Provisions relating to the Charges for Poor Law Unions.	Sections One, Three, Four, Six, and Thirteen.
11 & 12 Vict. c. 111	Poor Removal Act 1848	An Act to amend an Act of the Tenth Year of Her present Majesty, for amending the Laws relating to the Removal of the Poor.	Section Two.
11 & 12 Vict. c. 112	Metropolitan Commissioners of Sewers Act 1848	An Act to consolidate, and continue in force for Two Years and to the End of the then next Session of Parliament, the Metropolitan Commission of Sewers.	The whole act.
11 & 12 Vict. c. 114	Poor Law Auditors Act 1848	An Act to prevent District Auditors from taking Proceedings in certain Cases.	The whole act.
11 & 12 Vict. c. 115	Irish Reproductive Loan Fund Act 1848	An Act to vest in Her Majesty the Property of the Irish Reproductive Loan Fund Institution, and to dissolve the said Institution.	The whole act.
11 & 12 Vict. c. 118	Excise Act 1848	An Act to explain and amend the Law as to the Licence required for the Letting of Post Horses to Hire in Ireland, and the Law respecting Proceedings for Duties and Penalties under the Post Horse, Stage, and Hackney Carriage Acts in the United Kingdom.	Section One. Section Two, except so far as it relates to duties imposed for and in respect of passengers conveyed upon railways.
11 & 12 Vict. c. 119	Public Money Drainage Act 1848	An Act to simplify the Forms of Certificates under the Act authorizing the Advance of Money for the Improvement of Land by Drainage in Great Britain.	Section Five.
11 & 12 Vict. c. 120	Land Transfer (Ireland) Act 1848	An Act to facilitate the Transfer of Landed Property in Ireland.	Section Fifteen.
11 & 12 Vict. c. 121	Liqueur Act 1848	An Act the title of which begins with the words,—An Act to alter the Laws and Regulations of Excise,—and ends with the words,—Penalties and Forfeitures recovered under the Laws of Excise.	Except Sections Nine to Eleven and Eighteen.
11 & 12 Vict. c. 122	Bonded Warehouses Act 1848	An Act the title of which begins with the words,—An Act to amend the Laws respecting the Warehousing of British Spirits,—and ends with the words,—Removal of Goods subject to Excise Regulations from Customs Warehouse.	Except Section Twenty-six from "before any Goods" to "without such Certificate," and from "shall be subject" to end of that Section.
11 & 12 Vict. c. 126	Appropriation Act 1848	An Act to apply a Sum out of the Consolidated Fund, and certain other Sums, to the Service of the Year One thousand eight hundred and forty-eight; and to appropriate the Supplies granted in this Session of Parliament.	The whole act.
11 & 12 Vict. c. 127	Duties on Copper and Lead Act 1848	An Act to reduce the Duties on Copper and Lead.	The whole act.
11 & 12 Vict. c. 130	West Indian Loans Act 1848	An Act for guaranteeing the Interest on such Loans, not exceeding Five hundred thousand Pounds, as may be raised by the British Colonies on the Continent of South America, in the West Indies and the Mauritius, for certain Purposes.	The words "or any Three of them," (wherever they occur).
11 & 12 Vict. c. 131	Fever (Ireland) Act 1848	An Act to amend, and continue until the First Day of November One thousand eight hundred and forty-nine, and to the End of the then next Session of Parliament, an Act for making Provision for the Treatment of poor Persons afflicted with Fever in Ireland.	The whole act.
11 & 12 Vict. c. 132	Taxing Masters (Ireland) Act 1848	An Act for the Appointment of additional Taxing Masters for the High Court of Chancery in Ireland, and to regulate the Appointment of the Principal Assistants to the Masters in the Superior Courts of Law in Ireland.	Section Nine.
12 & 13 Vict. c. 1	Inland Revenue Board Act 1849	An Act to consolidate the Boards of Excise and Stamps and Taxes into One Board of Commissioners of Inland Revenue, and to make Provision for the Collection of such Revenue.	Sections Nine, Thirteen, and Eighteen.
12 & 13 Vict. c. 2	Habeas Corpus Suspension (Ireland) Act 1849	An Act the title of which begins with the words,—An Act to continue, until the First Day of September,—and ends with the words,—conspiring against Her Majesty's Person and Government.	The whole act.
12 & 13 Vict. c. 3	Supply Act 1849	An Act to apply the Sum of Eight Millions out of the Consolidated Fund to the Service of the Year One thousand eight hundred and forty-nine.	The whole act.
12 & 13 Vict. c. 4	Guardians (Ireland) Act 1849	An Act to amend the Laws relating to the Appointment of Vice Guardians of Unions in Ireland.	Sections One and Two. Section Three from "provided" to end of that Section. Section Four.
12 & 13 Vict. c. 5	Relief of Distress (Ireland) Act 1849	An Act to authorize an Advance of Money for the Relief of certain distressed Poor Law Unions in Ireland.	The whole act.
12 & 13 Vict. c. 6	Buckinghamshire Assizes Act 1849	An Act to repeal an Act of the Twenty-first Year of George the Second, for holding the Summer Assizes at Buckingham; and to authorize the Appointment of a more convenient Place for holding the same.	Section One.
12 & 13 Vict. c. 8	Poor Law (Overseers) Act 1849	An Act to remove Doubts as to the Appointment of Overseers in Cities and Boroughs.	Sections Two, Three, and Five.
12 & 13 Vict. c. 10	Mutiny Act 1849	An Act for punishing Mutiny and Desertion, and for the better Payment of the Army and their Quarters.	The whole act.
12 & 13 Vict. c. 12	Marine Mutiny Act 1849	An Act for the Regulation of Her Majesty's Royal Marine Forces while on shore.	The whole act.
12 & 13 Vict. c. 13	Poor Relief Act 1849	An Act to provide a more effectual Regulation and Control over the Maintenance of poor Persons in Houses not being the Workhouses of any Union or Parish.	Section Eight from "and it shall be lawful for the General" to end of that Section. Section Eleven.
12 & 13 Vict. c. 14	Distress for Rates Act 1849	An Act to enable the Overseers of the Poor and Surveyors of the Highways to recover the Costs of distraining for Rates.	Section Two from "so much" to "and that hereafter," and the word "is or are now or". Section Six, the words "have been or", "hereafter" and "is or". Section Seven. Section Nine from "every" to "hereafter".
12 & 13 Vict. c. 16	Justices Protection (Ireland) Act 1849	An Act to protect Justices of the Peace in Ireland from vexatious Actions for Acts done by them in the Execution of their Office.	Section Eleven from "and which said Tender" to "Issue aforesaid". Section Twelve from "or if he shall not prove that" to "Damages". Sections Sixteen, Seventeen, and Nineteen.
12 & 13 Vict. c. 17	Spirits (Ireland) Act 1849	An Act to continue for Two Years so much of an Act of the Second and Third Years of Her present Majesty, as enables Justices to grant licences for entering Places in which Spirits are sold without Licence in Ireland.	The whole act.
12 & 13 Vict. c. 20	Exchequer Bills Act 1849	An Act for raising the Sum of Seventeen millions seven hundred and sixty-six thousand seven hundred Pounds by Exchequer Bills, for the Service of the Year One thousand eight hundred and forty-nine.	The whole act.
12 & 13 Vict. c. 23	Improvement of Land (Ireland) Act 1849	An Act to authorize further Advances of Money for the Improvement of Landed Property, and the Promotion and Extension of Drainage and other Works of public Utility, in Ireland.	The whole act.
12 & 13 Vict. c. 24	Rate in Aid of Distressed Unions Act 1849	An Act to make Provision, until the Thirty-first Day of December One thousand eight hundred and fifty, for a General Rate in Aid of certain distressed Unions and Electoral Divisions in Ireland.	The whole act.
12 & 13 Vict. c. 26	Leases Act 1849	An Act for granting Relief against Defects in Leases made under Powers of Leasing, in certain Cases.	Section Seven from "and shall not" to end of that Section. Section Nine.
12 & 13 Vict. c. 31	Turnpike Roads (Scotland) Act 1849	An Act for requiring the Transmission of the annual Abstracts and Statement of Trustees of Turnpike Roads and Bridges in Scotland to the Secretary of State to be laid before Parliament.	Section Five.
12 & 13 Vict. c. 32	Grand Jury Cess (Ireland) Act 1849	An Act to continue to the End of the Year One thousand eight hundred and fifty-one certain temporary Provisions relating to the Collection of Grand Jury Cess in Ireland.	The whole act.
12 & 13 Vict. c. 34	Justices of the Peace Small Debt (Scotland) Act 1849	An Act to amend an Act regulating the Justice of the Peace Small Debt Courts in Scotland.	Section Five.
12 & 13 Vict. c. 35	Highways Returns Act 1849	An Act for requiring annual Returns of the Expenditure on Highways in England and Wales to be transmitted to the Secretary of State, and afterwards laid before Parliament.	Section Five.
12 & 13 Vict. c. 36	County Cess (Ireland) Act 1849	An Act to make Provision, during the present Year, and to the End of the Year One thousand eight hundred and fifty-one, relating to the Collection of County Cess in Ireland, and to the Remuneration of the Collectors thereof.	The whole act.
12 & 13 Vict. c. 37	Loan Societies Act 1849	An Act to continue to the First Day of October One thousand eight hundred and fifty, and to the End of the then next Session of Parliament, an Act to amend the Laws relating to Loan Societies.	The whole act.
12 & 13 Vict. c. 38	Assaults (Ireland) Act 1849	An Act to continue for Five Years an Act of the Second and Third Years of Her present Majesty, for the better Prevention and Punishment of Assaults in Ireland.	The whole act.
12 & 13 Vict. c. 39	Ecclesiastical Jurisdiction Act 1849	An Act for further continuing, until the First Day of August One thousand eight hundred and fifty, and to the End of the then next Session of Parliament, certain temporary Provisions concerning Ecclesiastical Jurisdiction in England.	The whole act.
12 & 13 Vict. c. 40	Soap Duties Allowances Act 1849	An Act to continue, until the Thirty-first Day of July One thousand eight hundred and fifty, and to the End of the then next Session of Parliament, certain of the Allowances of the Duty of Excise on Soap used in Manufactures.	The whole act.
12 & 13 Vict. c. 42	Sheriff of Westmorland Act 1849	An Act to provide for the Execution for One Year of the Office of Sheriff in the County of Westmoreland.	The whole act.
12 & 13 Vict. c. 44	Supply (No. 2) Act 1849	An Act to apply the Sum of Three Millions out of the Consolidated Fund to the Service of the Year One thousand eight hundred and forty-nine.	The whole act.
12 & 13 Vict. c. 45	Quarter Sessions Act 1849	An Act to amend the Procedure in Courts of General and Quarter Session of the Peace in England and Wales, and for the better Advancement of Justice in Cases within the Jurisdiction of those Courts.	Sections Twenty and Twenty-one.
12 & 13 Vict. c. 46	Union of Turnpike Trusts Act 1849	An Act to facilitate the Union of Turnpike Trusts.	Section Five from "that after" to "Years". Section Seven.
12 & 13 Vict. c. 47	Turnpike Acts (Ireland) Act 1849	An Act to continue certain Acts for regulating Turnpike Roads in Ireland.	The whole act.
12 & 13 Vict. c. 49	School Sites Act 1849	An Act to extend and explain the Provisions of the Acts for the granting of Sites for Schools.	Section Eight.
12 & 13 Vict. c. 51	Judicial Factors Act 1849	An Act for the better Protection of the Property of Pupils, absent Persons, and Persons under Mental Incapacity in Scotland.	Section Forty-one.
12 & 13 Vict. c. 52	Militia Ballots Suspension Act 1849	An Act to suspend, until the First Day of October One thousand eight hundred and fifty, the making of Lists and the Ballots and Enrolments for the Militia of the United Kingdom.	The whole act.
12 & 13 Vict. c. 53	Solicitors (Ireland) Act 1849	An Act for consolidating and amending certain of the Laws relating to Attorneys and Solicitors in Ireland.	Sections One and Ten.
12 & 13 Vict. c. 54	Highway Rates Act 1849	An Act to continue until the First Day of October One thousand eight hundred and fifty, and to the End of the then next Session of Parliament, an Act for authorizing the Application of Highway Rates to Turnpike Roads.	The whole act.
12 & 13 Vict. c. 56	Lunatic Asylums (Ireland) Act 1849	An Act the title of which begins with the words,—An Act to continue, until the Thirty-first Day of July,—and ends with the words,—Private Lunatic Asylums in Ireland.	The whole act.
12 & 13 Vict. c. 59	Landed Property Improvement (Ireland) Act 1849	An Act to amend an Act of the Tenth Year of Her Majesty concerning the Improvement of Landed Property in Ireland.	Sections Five and Seven.
12 & 13 Vict. c. 60	Poor (Ireland) Act 1849	An Act further to amend an Act of the Tenth Year of Her present Majesty for rendering valid certain Proceedings for the Relief of Distress in Ireland, by Employment of the labouring Poor, and to indemnify those who have acted in such Proceedings.	The whole act.
12 & 13 Vict. c. 61	Poor Rates Act 1849	An Act the title of which begins with the words,—An Act to continue, until the First Day of October,—and ends with the words,—rates; such in respect of Stock in Trade or other Property to the Relief of the Poor.	The whole act.
12 & 13 Vict. c. 63	Relief of Distress (Ireland) (No. 2) Act 1849	An Act to authorize a further Advance of Money for the Relief of certain distressed Poor Law Unions in Ireland.	The whole act.
12 & 13 Vict. c. 64	Poor Law (Justices Jurisdiction) Act 1849	An Act to remove Doubts as to the Authority of Justices of the Peace to act in certain Matters relating to the Poor in Cities and Boroughs.	Sections Two and Three.
12 & 13 Vict. c. 65	County Rates within Boroughs Act 1849	An Act to provide a more effectual Mode of levying and collecting County Rates, County Police Rates, and District Police Rates in Parishes situated partly within and partly without the Limits of Boroughs which are not liable to such Rates.	Sections Six and Seven.
12 & 13 Vict. c. 67	Sequestration Act 1849	An Act to extend the Remedies of Sequestrators of Ecclesiastical Benefices.	Section Three.
12 & 13 Vict. c. 68	Consular Marriages Act 1849	An Act for facilitating the Marriage of British Subjects resident in Foreign Countries.	Section Twenty-two.
12 & 13 Vict. c. 72	House of Commons Offices Act 1849	An Act further to simplify the Titles of certain Acts relating to the Office of the House of Commons.	Section One from "from and after" to "repealed; and". Sections Two and Three. Section Four to "therewith". Section Five to "repealed; and" and the word "thenceforth". Section Seven.
12 & 13 Vict. c. 74	Trustees Relief Act 1849	An Act for the further Relief of Trustees.	Section One from "the East" to "Sea Company;". Section Two.
12 & 13 Vict. c. 75	Militia Pay Act 1849	An Act the title of which begins with the words,—An Act to defray until the First Day of August One thousand eight hundred and fifty the Charge of the Pay,—and ends with the words,—Militia; and to authorize the Employment of the Non-commissioned Officers.	The whole act.
12 & 13 Vict. c. 77	Incumbered Estates (Ireland) Act 1849	An Act further to facilitate the Sale and Transfer of Incumbered Estates in Ireland.	The whole act.
12 & 13 Vict. c. 78	House of Lords Costs Taxation Act 1849	An Act for the more effectual Taxation of Costs on Private Bills in the House of Lords, and to facilitate the Taxation of other Costs on Private Bills in certain Cases.	Sections One and Sixteen.
12 & 13 Vict. c. 82	Boroughs, Relief from County Expenditure Act 1849	An Act to relieve Boroughs, in certain Cases, from Contribution to certain Descriptions of County Expenditure.	Section One from "provided that" to "passed".
12 & 13 Vict. c. 87	Turnpike Acts Continuance Act 1849	An Act to continue certain Turnpike Acts in Great Britain for limited Periods, and to make certain Provisions respecting Turnpike Roads in England.	Sections One and Two. Section Eight from "except" to "continued,". The Schedule.
12 & 13 Vict. c. 90	Customs Act 1849	An Act to amend the Laws relating to the Customs.	Section Forty-one.
12 & 13 Vict. c. 92	Cruelty to Animals Act 1849	An Act for the more effectual Prevention of Cruelty to Animals.	Section One. Section Twenty-seven from "Provided" to end of that Section. Sections Twenty-seven and Twenty-eight so far as they relate to plea of general issue and venue, but so far only as relates to Ireland. Section Thirty-one.
12 & 13 Vict. c. 95	Judgments (Ireland) Act 1849	An Act to amend the Law concerning Judgments in Ireland.	Sections One and Twelve.
12 & 13 Vict. c. 98	Appropriation Act 1849	An Act to apply a Sum out of the Consolidated Fund, and certain other Sums, to the Service of the Year One thousand eight hundred and forty-nine; and to appropriate the Supplies granted in this Session of Parliament.	The whole act.
12 & 13 Vict. c. 101	County Courts Act 1849	An Act to amend the Act for the more easy Recovery of Small Debts and Demands in England, and to abolish certain Inferior Courts of Record.	Section One to "shall be repealed; and" and the words "for the like Period". Section Two to "repealed, and". Sections Four, Seven to Nine, and Eleven to Fifteen. Section Sixteen from "until" to end of that Section. Section Seventeen to "Case; and". Section Nineteen.
12 & 13 Vict. c. 103	Poor Law Amendment Act 1849	An Act to continue an Act of the last Session of Parliament, for charging the Maintenance of certain poor Persons in Unions upon the Common Fund; and to make certain Amendments in the Laws for the Relief of the Poor.	Sections One and Two. Section Three from "under the Act" to "Vagrancy, or". Section Thirteen, the words "heretofore made," and from "within Twelve Months next after the passing" to "made,". Section Twenty-three.
12 & 13 Vict. c. 104	Poor Relief (Ireland) Act 1849	An Act to amend the Acts for the more effectual Relief of the destitute Poor in Ireland.	Section Two from "That so much" to "under the said Act; and". Sections Twelve and Thirty-two.
12 & 13 Vict. c. 105	Renewable Leasehold Conversion Act 1849	An Act for converting the renewable Leasehold Tenure of Lands in Ireland into Fee-simple.	Section Forty-one.
12 & 13 Vict. c. 109	Petty Bag Act 1849	An Act to amend an Act to regulate certain Offices in the Petty Bag in the High Court of Chancery, the Practice of the Common-Law Side of that Court, and the Enrolment Office of the said Court.	Sections Fifteen and Sixteen. Section Thirty from "already" to "commenced". Section Thirty-two from "he" to "hear or". Section Thirty-nine, the words "now pending or". Sections Forty-two to Forty-four and Forty-nine. The following Sections and parts of Sections from the commencement of the "Supreme Court of Judicature Act, 1873," namely:— Sections Twenty-four and Twenty-five. Section Twenty-six from "whether" to end of that Section. Section Twenty-seven from "whether the same" to "Common Law", from "whether such Day" to "in Vacation," and from "and every" to "a Day in Term-Time". Section Twenty-eight from "attended" to end of that Section. Section Thirty-two from "and it shall and" to end of that Section. Section Thirty-four, the words "and a Transcript" to end of that Section. Sections Thirty-four to Thirty-seven and Forty-eight.
13 & 14 Vict. c. 1	County Cess (Ireland) Act 1850	An Act to amend an Act of the last Session, for making Provision for the Collection of County Cess in Ireland, and for the Remuneration of the Collectors thereof.	The whole act.
13 & 14 Vict. c. 3	Supply Act 1850	An Act to apply the Sum of Eight Millions out of the Consolidated Fund to the Service of the Year One thousand eight hundred and fifty.	The whole act.
13 & 14 Vict. c. 4	Bridges (Ireland) Act 1850	An Act for requiring the Transmission of annual Abstracts of Accounts and Statements of Trustees or Commissioners of Turnpike Roads and Bridges in Ireland to the Lord Lieutenant to be laid before Parliament.	Section Six. The rest of this Act so far as it relates to turnpike roads.
13 & 14 Vict. c. 5	Mutiny Act 1850	An Act for punishing Mutiny and Desertion, and for the better Payment of the Army and their Quarters.	The whole act.
13 & 14 Vict. c. 6	Marine Mutiny Act 1850	An Act for the Regulation of Her Majesty's Royal Marine Forces while on shore.	The whole act.
13 & 14 Vict. c. 7	London Hackney Carriages Act 1850	An Act for consolidating the Office of the Registrar of Metropolitan Public Carriages with the Office of Commissioners of Police of the Metropolis, and making other Provisions in regard to the consolidated Offices.	Section One. Section Five from "except as" to end of that Section. Sections Nine and Ten.
13 & 14 Vict. c. 9	Brick Duties Repeal Act	An Act to repeal the Duties and Drawbacks of Excise on Bricks.	The whole act.
13 & 14 Vict. c. 10	Exchequer Bills Act 1850	An Act for raising the Sum of Nine millions two hundred thousand Pounds by Exchequer Bills, for the Service of the Year One thousand eight hundred and fifty.	The whole act.
13 & 14 Vict. c. 11	School Districts Act 1850	An Act to make better Provision for the Contribution of Unions and Parishes in School Districts to the Common Funds of the respective Districts.	The whole act.
13 & 14 Vict. c. 16	Supreme Court (England) Act 1850	An Act to enable the Judges of the Courts of Common Law at Westminster to alter the Forms of Pleading.	The whole act.
13 & 14 Vict. c. 17	Leases Act 1850	An Act to amend an Act of the last Session of Parliament for granting Relief against Defects in Leases made under Powers of Leasing in certain Cases.	Sections One and Four.
13 & 14 Vict. c. 18	Supreme Court (Ireland) Act 1850	An Act for the Regulation of Process and Practice in the Superior Courts of Common Law in Ireland.	Section Thirty-two to "of the said consolidated Office; and". Section Thirty-five. Section Thirty-six from "and that" to end of that Section. Section Thirty-seven to "think just; and" and from "Provided also" to end of that Section. Sections Forty-nine, Fifty, and Fifty-two. The Schedule.
13 & 14 Vict. c. 19	Supreme Court (Ireland) (Amendment) Act 1850	An Act to explain and amend an Act for the Regulation of Process and Practice in the Superior Courts of Common Law in Ireland.	The whole act.
13 & 14 Vict. c. 20	Parish Constables Act 1850	An Act to amend an Act of the Fifth and Sixth Years of Her present Majesty, relating to the Appointment and Payment of Parish Constables.	Sections Three, Six, and Nine.
13 & 14 Vict. c. 22	Exchequer Bills Act 1850	An Act for raising the Sum of Eight millions five hundred and fifty-eight thousand seven hundred Pounds by Exchequer Bills, for the Service of the Year One thousand eight hundred and fifty.	The whole act.
13 & 14 Vict. c. 23	Fairs and Markets Act 1850	An Act to repeal an Exception in an Act of the Twenty-seventh Year of King Henry the Sixth concerning the Days whereon Fairs and Markets ought not to be kept.	The whole act.
13 & 14 Vict. c. 25	Justice of Assizes Act 1850	An Act to enable Queen's Counsel and others, not being of the Degree of the Coif, to act as Judges of Assize.	Repealed from the commencement of the "Supreme Court of Judicature Act, 1873".
13 & 14 Vict. c. 26	Piracy Act 1850	An Act to repeal an Act of the Sixth Year of King George the Fourth, for encouraging the Capture or Destruction of Piratical Ships and Vessels; and to make other Provisions in lieu thereof.	Section One. Section Two, the words "or any of the Ships or Vessels of War of the East India Company", "after the said First Day of June", and from "including" to "Company". Section Four. Section Five, the words "or the Ships or Vessels of War of the East India Company", from "in Port" to "Ships, or their Boats," (where those words first occur), and from "and which" to end of that Section. Section Seven.
13 & 14 Vict. c. 27	Pirates (Head Money) Repeal Act Commencement Act 1850	An Act the title of which begins with the words,—An Act to provide for the Commencement of an Act of the present Session,—and ends with the words,—and to make other Provisions in lieu thereof.	The whole act.
13 & 14 Vict. c. 28	Trustee Appointment Act 1850	An Act to render more simple and effectual the Titles by which Congregations or Societies for Purposes of Religious Worship or Education in England and Ireland hold Property for such Purposes.	Section Five.
13 & 14 Vict. c. 29	Judgment Mortgage (Ireland) Act 1850	An Act to amend the Laws concerning Judgments in Ireland.	Section Thirteen.
13 & 14 Vict. c. 30	Sheriff of Westmorland Act 1850	An Act to provide for the Appointment of Sheriff of the County of Westmoreland.	Sections One and Three.
13 & 14 Vict. c. 31	Public Money Drainage Act 1850	An Act to authorize further Advances of Money for Drainage and the Improvement of Landed Property in the United Kingdom, and to amend the Acts relating to such Advances.	Section One so far as it relates to advances for improvement of landed property in Ireland. Sections Nine to Fourteen.
13 & 14 Vict. c. 34	Turnpike Acts (Ireland) Continuance Act 1850	An Act to continue certain Acts for regulating Turnpike Roads in Ireland.	The whole act.
13 & 14 Vict. c. 35	Court of Chancery (England) Act 1850	An Act to further shorten the Time of taking Orders Nisi and of Proceedings in the High Court of Chancery in England.	Section Thirteen from "Provided always," to "such further Directions". Section Nineteen from "until" to "Force". Section Twenty-six. Section Twenty-nine to "and that". Sections Thirty-five and Thirty-six.
13 & 14 Vict. c. 36	Court of Session Act 1850	An Act to facilitate Procedure in the Court of Session in Scotland.	Sections Two to Four. Section Five from "and such" to end of that Section. Section Six. Section Nine, the words "or Advocation," "Advocation or," and "Advocation and". Section Twelve. Section Twenty, the words "of of Advocation," (wherever they occur). Section Twenty-one. Section Twenty-three, the word "Advocation,". Section Thirty. Section Thirty-two, the words "Advocation or" (wherever they occur). Section Thirty-three from "and in every Process of Advocation" to "Advocation as aforesaid" and the words "and of Advocation". Sections Thirty-four and Thirty-eight. Section Fifty-nine to "Provided always, that". Section Fifty-two. Section Fifty-four, the words "of Advocation and". Section Fifty-seven. Schedule (B.), the words "or Note of Advocation".
13 & 14 Vict. c. 38	Marriages Confirmation Act 1850	An Act to render valid certain Marriages solemnized in the new Church at Upton cum Chalvey in the County of Buckingham and Diocese of Oxford.	Section Two.
13 & 14 Vict. c. 39	Convict Prisons Act 1850	An Act for better Government of Convict Prisons.	Sections Three and Five.
13 & 14 Vict. c. 43	Court of Chancery of Lancaster Act 1850	An Act to amend the Practice and Proceedings of the Court of Chancery of the County Palatine of Lancaster.	Section One so far as it relates to the Vice-Chancellor of the County Palatine of Lancaster and one of the Vice-Chancellors of the High Court of Chancery. Sections Twenty-five and Twenty-six. Section Twenty-seven, the words "in case of the Abolition of the said Clerkships in Court". Section Twenty-nine to "thenceforth". Section Thirty from "in the" to "repealed,". Section Thirty-three from "after" to "aforesaid,". Section Thirty-eight.
13 & 14 Vict. c. 44	Census (Ireland) Act 1850	An Act for taking an Account of the Population of Ireland.	The whole act.
13 & 14 Vict. c. 45	Loan Societies Act 1850	An Act to continue an Act to amend the Laws relating to Loan Societies.	The whole act.
13 & 14 Vict. c. 46	Militia Ballots Suspension Act 1850	An Act to suspend the making of Lists and the Ballots and Enrolments for the Militia of the United Kingdom.	The whole act.
13 & 14 Vict. c. 47	Ecclesiastical Jurisdiction Act 1850	An Act for further continuing certain temporary Provisions concerning Ecclesiastical Jurisdiction in England.	The whole act.
13 & 14 Vict. c. 48	Linen, etc., Manufactures (Ireland) Act 1850	An Act to continue certain Acts relating to Linen, Hempen, and other Manufactures in Ireland.	The whole act.
13 & 14 Vict. c. 49	Militia Pay Act 1850	An Act the title of which begins with the words,—An Act to defray the Charge of the Pay, Clothing, and contingent and other Expenses,—and ends with the words,—and to authorize the Employment of the Non-commissioned Officers.	The whole act.
13 & 14 Vict. c. 50	Poor Rates Act 1850	An Act to continue the Exemption of Inhabitants from Liability to be rated as such in respect of Stock in Trade or other Property to the Relief of the Poor.	The whole act.
13 & 14 Vict. c. 51	Exchequer Equitable Jurisdiction (Ireland) Act 1850	An Act for the Transfer of the Equitable Jurisdiction of the Court of Exchequer to the Court of Chancery in Ireland.	Sections Two to Seven, Nine and Ten. Section Thirteen from "shall on the said First Day of August" to "other Proceedings". Sections Fifteen, Eighteen, Twenty-two, and Twenty-four to Twenty-seven. Section Twenty-eight to "repealed, and". Section Thirty-two.
13 & 14 Vict. c. 53	Census, Great Britain Act 1850	An Act for taking account of the Population of Great Britain.	The whole act.
13 & 14 Vict. c. 54	Factory Act 1850	An Act to amend the Laws relating to Labour in Factories.	Section Nine from "Provided" to end of that Section.
13 & 14 Vict. c. 55	Corporation of Dublin Act 1850	An Act to amend an Act of the last Session for amending an Act for the Regulation of Municipal Corporations in Ireland so far as relates to the Borough of Dublin.	The whole act.
13 & 14 Vict. c. 57	Vestries Act 1850	An Act to prevent the holding of Vestry or other Meetings in Churches, and for regulating the Appointment of Vestry Clerks.	Section Ten from "elected under an Act passed in the Fifty-ninth" to "Poor, or". Section Eleven.
13 & 14 Vict. c. 58	Highway Rates Act 1850	An Act to continue an Act for authorizing the Application of Highway Rates to Turnpike Roads.	The whole act.
13 & 14 Vict. c. 60	Trustee Act 1850	An Act to consolidate and amend the Laws relating to the Conveyance and Transfer of Real and Personal Property vested in Mortgagees and Trustees.	Sections One, Thirty-eight, and Thirty-nine. Section Forty-one, the words "Motion or" (wherever they occur). Section Forty-two, the words "Motion or" (wherever they occur), and the words "Certificate or". Sections Fifty, Fifty-nine, and Sixty.
13 & 14 Vict. c. 61	County Courts Act 1850	An Act to extend the Act for the more easy Recovery of Small Debts and Demands in England, and to amend the same.	Section Four to "repealed; and". Section Nineteen from "and if any" to end of that Section. Section Twenty-five. And from the commencement of the "Supreme Court of Judicature Act, 1873,"— Section Twenty-two, the words "as well in Term Time as in Vacation" (wherever they occur).
13 & 14 Vict. c. 63	Equivalent Company Act 1850	An Act to provide for the Redemption of an Annuity of Ten thousand Pounds payable to the Bank of Portugal.	The whole act.
13 & 14 Vict. c. 64	Bridges Act 1850	An Act to provide for more effectually maintaining, repairing, improving, and rebuilding Bridges in Cities and Boroughs.	Section Six.
13 & 14 Vict. c. 67	Brewers' Licensing Act 1850	An Act to reduce the Duty of Excise on Sugar manufactured in the United Kingdom, and to impose a countervailing Duty on Sugar used in the brewing of Beer for Sale; and also to amend the Laws relating to the Licences granted to Brewers and Distillers.	Sections One to Five. Section Six from "in retail" to "behalf, or" and the words "the Premises mentioned in such Licence as last aforesaid, or" and the subsequent words "retail or". Section Seven to "being a Brewer of Beer". Section Eight.
13 & 14 Vict. c. 68	Parliamentary Elections (Ireland) Act 1850	An Act to shorten the Duration of Elections in Ireland, and for establishing additional Places for taking the Poll thereat.	Section Two from "Provided" to end of that Section. Section Seventeen to "passed; and that". Sections Twenty-three and Twenty-six.
13 & 14 Vict. c. 69	Representation of the People (Ireland) Act 1850	An Act to amend the Laws which regulate the Qualification and Registration of Parliamentary Voters in Ireland, and to alter the Law for rating Immediate Lessors of Premises to the Poor Rate in certain Boroughs.	Section One from "the Ninth" to "succeeding Year)" (where those words next occur), from "on or before the Thirtieth" to "succeeding Year" (where those words next occur), and from "to the Thirty-first" to "succeeding Year". Section Two from "the Ninth" to "succeeding Year". Section Five from "the Ninth" to "succeeding Year" (where those words next occur), from "on or before the Thirtieth" to "succeeding Year" (where those words next occur), and from "to the Thirty-first" to "succeeding Year". Sections Ten and Eleven. Section Twelve from "after" to "fifty-one". Section Thirteen from "to the Ninth" (where those words first occur) to "succeeding Year)" (where these words next occur) and from "the Ninth" (where those words next occur) to "succeeding Year". Section Fourteen from "to the Ninth" (where those words first occur) to "succeeding Year)" (where those words next occur), from "to the Thirty-first" to "succeeding Year" (where those words next occur), and from "to the Ninth" (where those words next occur) to "fifty-one". Section Fifteen from "on or before the Ninth" to "such Clerk of the Peace shall," and from "after the Year" to "fifty-one". Section Sixteen from "Ninth" to "fifty, and", from "according to the Form (numbered 2)" to "Lists in Ireland," and from "of the Lists" to "Act, or". Sections Seventeen and Eighteen. Section Nineteen from "after" to "fifty-one". Section Twenty-two to "Effect; and", and the words "after One thousand eight hundred and fifty-one". Section Twenty-three from "on or before the Thirtieth" to "fifty, and", from "on or before the Twenty-fifth" to "fifty, or" (where those words next occur), from "in each" to "fifty-first" (where those words next occur), and the words "after One thousand eight hundred and fifty-one". Section Twenty-four to "Act, and", and the words "succeeding" and "respective". Section Twenty-five from "between the Twelfth" to "fifty, and". Section Twenty-six to "fifty-one, and", the words "after One thousand eight hundred and fifty-one" (wherever they occur), from "on the Ninth" to "fifty), and" (where those words next occur), the words "(as regards each Year after One thousand eight hundred and fifty-one)", from "on or before the Twelfth" to "fifty, and" (where those words next occur), and from "on or before the said Twelfth" to "fifty-one". Section Twenty-seven from "on or before the Fourteenth" to "fifty, and" and from "after" to "fifty-one". Section Twenty-eight. Section Twenty-nine from "on or before the Ninth" to "fifty, and" (where those words next occur), the words "in the Year One thousand eight hundred and fifty-two, and", the word "succeeding" (where it next occurs), from "in the Years" to "Five Years," and from "the said alphabetical" to "fifty-one". Section Thirty from "on or before the Thirteenth" to "fifty, and" (where those words next occur), the words "after One thousand eight hundred and fifty-one", from "on or before the Thirtieth" to "fifty, and", from "to the" to "fifty-one" (where those words next occur), and from "to the Thirty-first" to "succeeding Year". Section Thirty-one from "between the Fifth" to "fifty, and" (where those words next occur), the words "after One thousand eight hundred and fifty-one" (wherever they occur), from "on or before the Thirtieth" to "fifty, and", and from "to the Thirty-first" to "succeeding Year". Section Thirty-two from "on or before the Tenth" to "fifty, and", the words "after One thousand eight hundred and fifty-one" (wherever they occur), from "shall not" to "September, and" and from "(in the" (where those words next occur) to "fifty-one)". Section Thirty-three from "on or before the Ninth" to "fifty, and" (where those words next occur), the words "after One thousand eight hundred and fifty-one" (wherever they occur), from "and shall in" to "Year" (where those words next occur), from "on or before the Thirtieth" to "fifty, or", from "to the Thirty-first" to "succeeding Year", the word "respective" (where those words next occur), and from "to the Ninth" to "fifty, and". Section Thirty-four from "on the Ninth" to "fifty-one, or", from "on or before the Twenty-fifth" to "fifty, and" (where these words next occur), the words "after One thousand eight hundred and fifty-one" (wherever they occur), and from "on or before the Second" to "fifty, and". Section Thirty-five from "between the Fifteenth" to "fifty, and" and from "after" to "fifty-one". Section Thirty-six from "on the Ninth" to "fifty-one), or", the words "(as regards each Year after One thousand eight hundred and fifty-one)", from "on or before the Twelfth" to "fifty, and" (where those words next occur), the words "after One thousand eight hundred and fifty-one" (wherever they occur), and from "on or before the said Twelfth" to "fifty-one". Section Thirty-seven from "on or before the Fourteenth" to "fifty, and" and from "after" to "fifty-one". Section Thirty-eight from "on or before the Seventeenth" to "fifty, and", the words "after One thousand eight hundred and fifty-one" (where they next occur), and from "(in the" (where those words next occur) to "fifty-one)". Section Forty-three from "the List" to "fifty-one," and the words "List of registered Voters or". Section Forty-four from "in the Year" to "December," and the words "after One thousand eight hundred and fifty-one" (wherever they occur), and from "as soon as possible" (where those words secondly occur) to "fifty, and". Section Forty-five. Section Forty-six from "between the First" to "fifty-one, and" and the word "succeeding". Section Forty-seven from "between the First" to "fifty-one, and" and the word "succeeding". Section Forty-eight from "and shall also" to "revised Act," the word "succeeding", from "between the Ninth" to "fifty-one), and" from "(as regards" (where those words next occur) to "fifty-one,". Section Forty-nine from "shall in" to "Act, and" and the words "(as regards succeeding Year)". Section Fifty-two from "on the Ninth" to "fifty-one), or" and the words "(as regards each succeeding Year)". Section Fifty-three from "on or before the" to "specified," from "on the Ninth" (where those words first occur) to "fifty-one), or" (where those words next occur), the words "(as regards any succeeding Year)" (wherever they occur), from "Provided also, that every" to "expire", from "on the Ninth" (where those words next occur) to "fifty-one, or", and from "as regards" (where those words next occur) to "the said Ninth" to "fifty-one, or". Section Fifty-six from "after the Fourteenth" to "Year", or", the word "succeeding" and the words "and Dates of Registry". Section Sixty-three from "shall, as regards the first" to "Act" (where that word last occurs). Section Sixty-four from "shall, as regards the first" to "under this Act)". Section Seventy-five from "within" to "Year), and" and the words "(as regards any subsequent Year)". Section Seventy-six from "of the said Easter" to "and also" and from "in every" to "fifty-one". Section Eighty-eight from "holden" to "fifty-one". Section Ninety from "holden" to "fifty-one". Section Ninety-eight from "at any Election" (where those words first occur) to "fifty-one". Section One hundred and four from "in the first" to "fifty-one". Section One hundred and nine from "during the like" to "first Election" (where those words next occur), from "during the Year" to "fifty-one" (where those words next occur), from the "Thirtieth" (where those words next occur) to "fifty, or", and the subsequent words "after One thousand eight hundred and fifty-one,". Section One hundred and eleven from "the Ninth" to "fifty-one), or" and from "as regards each" to "fifty-one),". Schedule (A.) Forms, No. 1. and the Note thereto, No. 2. and the Note thereto, No. 3. the words "in every Year after 1851", No. 4., No. 5., No. 6. and the foot-note thereto, No. 7. and the Note at end, No. 8. the words "in all Years after 1851", No. 12. the words "in all Years after 1851". No. 13. the words "[if registered under 2 & 3 Will. 4. c. 88. it must be so stated]", No. 14. the last column and the Notes at end, and No. 15. the words "[To be used in all Years after 1851.]". Schedule (B.) Forms, No. 1. and the Note at end, No. 2. and the Note at end, No. 3. and the Note at end, No. 4. the marginal note with the reference to it and the paragraph in brackets and the foot-note thereto with the reference to it, No. 5. the marginal note with the reference to it, No. 6. the marginal note with the reference to it, No. 7. the fifth column, the marginal note with the reference to it and the note at end, No. 8. the fifth column and the Note at end, No. 9. the third column and the Note at end, No. 10. from "and that in all Years after 1851", No. 11. the fifth column, No. 12. the fourth column, No. 13. the third column, No. 14. the Note at end from "and if the Person", No. 15. the Note at end, No. 16. the words "(if registered under 2 & 3 Will. 4. c. 88. so state)," No. 17. the words "(if registered under 2 & 3 Will. 4. c. 88. so state.)" and No. 18. the second column.
13 & 14 Vict. c. 71	Sheep and Cattle Disease Prevention Act 1850	An Act the title of which begins with the words,—An Act to continue an Act of the Eleventh and Twelfth Years,—and ends with the words,—contagious or infectious Diseases among Sheep, Cattle, and other Animals.	The whole act.
13 & 14 Vict. c. 72	Registration of Assurances (Ireland) Act 1850	An Act to amend the Laws for the Registration of Assurances of Lands in Ireland.	Section Sixty-five.
13 & 14 Vict. c. 73	Attachment of Goods (Ireland) Act 1850	An Act to amend the Law relating to Proceedings by Process of Attachment of Goods in the Borough and other Courts of Record in Ireland.	Sections One, Eleven, Thirteen, and Fourteen.
13 & 14 Vict. c. 74	Judgments Registry (Ireland) Act 1850	An Act for the better Regulation of the Office of Register of Judgments in Ireland.	Sections Seven and Thirteen.
13 & 14 Vict. c. 75	Court of Common Pleas Act 1850	An Act to regulate the Receipt and Amount of Fees receivable by certain Officers in the Court of Common Pleas.	Section Five.
13 & 14 Vict. c. 79	Annual Turnpike Acts Continuance Act 1850	An Act to continue certain Turnpike Acts in Great Britain, and to make further Provisions respecting Turnpike Roads in England.	Sections One, Two, and Six. Section Nine from "except" to "continued;". The Schedule.
13 & 14 Vict. c. 80	Repeal of Part of Palliser's Act for the Encouragement of Fisheries Act 1850	An Act the title of which begins with the words,—An Act to repeal Part of an Act of the Eleventh Year of King George the Third,—and ends with the words,—said Fisheries to the Ports thereof at the End of the Fishing Season.	The whole act.
13 & 14 Vict. c. 82	Grand Jury Cess (Ireland) Act 1850	An Act to extend the Remedies for the Collection of Grand Jury Cess in Ireland.	Section Three.
13 & 14 Vict. c. 83	Abandonment of Railways Act 1850	An Act to facilitate the Abandonment of Railways, and the Dissolution of Railway Companies, in certain Cases.	Section Thirty-five from "any Action or Suit or other" to "Suit, not". Section Forty.
13 & 14 Vict. c. 85	Assizes (Ireland) Act 1850	An Act to provide for holding the Assizes of certain Counties of Cities and Towns in Ireland at the adjoining Assize Towns of the adjacent Counties in certain Cases; and to make Provisions as to Going Circuits and the Change of Assize Towns.	Section Six.
13 & 14 Vict. c. 87	Police Superannuation Fund Act 1850	An Act for Payment of a Moiety of certain Penalties towards Police Superannuation Funds.	The whole act.
13 & 14 Vict. c. 88	Fisheries (Ireland) Act 1850	An Act to amend the Law relating to Engines used in the Rivers and on the Sea Coasts of Ireland for the taking of Fish.	Section Fifty-seven.
13 & 14 Vict. c. 89	Court of Chancery (Ireland) Regulation Act 1850	An Act to regulate the Proceedings in the High Court of Chancery in Ireland.	Section Thirty-six from "and shall be charged" to "such quarter Day". Section Thirty-seven from "and the said Secretary" to end of that Section. Section Forty. Section Forty-one, the words "or any Three or more of them," (wherever they occur), and from "and all such" to "Purposes". The Schedule.
13 & 14 Vict. c. 91	Borough Justices Act 1850	An Act to authorize Justices of any Borough having a separate Gaol to commit Assize Prisoners to such Gaol, and to extend the Jurisdiction of Borough Justices to all Offences and Matters arising within the Borough for which they act.	Section One from "and whenever" to "situated;". Section Twelve.
13 & 14 Vict. c. 92	Cruelty to Animals (Scotland) Act 1850	An Act for the more effectual Prevention of Cruelty to Animals in Scotland.	Section Thirteen.
13 & 14 Vict. c. 94	Ecclesiastical Commissioners Act 1850	An Act to amend the Acts relating to the Ecclesiastical Commissioners for England.	Section Five to "repealed; and". Section Seven from "within" to "again". Section Thirteen to "repealed,". Sections Sixteen and Eighteen. Section Twenty-two from "and there shall" to end of that Section. Section Twenty-seven from "as to any" to "existing" and from "is to say" to "Act; and". Section Twenty-nine.
13 & 14 Vict. c. 98	Pluralities Act 1850	An Act to amend the Law relating to the holding of Benefices in Plurality.	Sections Nine and Fourteen.
13 & 14 Vict. c. 99	Rating of Small Tenements Act 1850	An Act for the better assessing and collecting the Poor Rates and Highway Rates in respect of Small Tenements.	The whole act.
13 & 14 Vict. c. 101	Poor Law Amendment Act 1850	An Act the title of which begins with the words,—An Act to continue Two Acts passed in the Twelfth and Thirteenth Years,—and ends with the words,—Relief of the Poor.	Section One, the word "temporary", and from "shall continue" to "Parliament, and" and words "and Trustees and Hearing". Section Thirteen.
13 & 14 Vict. c. 104	Copyright of Designs Act 1850	An Act to extend and amend the Acts relating to the Copyright of Designs.	Section Sixteen so far as it relates to the Act of the Thirty-eight Year of King George the Third therein mentioned.
13 & 14 Vict. c. 105	Liberties Act 1850	An Act for facilitating the Union of Liberties with the Counties in which they are situate.	Section Twelve.
13 & 14 Vict. c. 106	Crime and Outrage (Ireland) Act 1850	An Act to continue, for a Time to be limited, an Act of the Eleventh Year of Her present Majesty, for the better Prevention of Crime and Outrage in certain Parts of Ireland.	The whole act.
13 & 14 Vict. c. 107	Appropriation Act 1850	An Act to apply a Sum out of the Consolidated Fund, and certain other Sums, to the Service of the Year One thousand eight hundred and fifty; and to appropriate the Supplies granted in this Session of Parliament.	The whole act.
13 & 14 Vict. c. 110	Savings Banks (Ireland) Act 1850	An Act to continue the Act for amending the Laws relating to Savings Banks in Ireland.	The whole act.
13 & 14 Vict. c. 113	Improvement of Land (Ireland) Act 1850	An Act to authorize Transfer of Loans for the Improvement of Land in Ireland to other Land.	The whole act.
13 & 14 Vict. c. 114	Stamp Duties (Ireland) Act 1850	An Act to regulate the Service of Notices on Proceedings in the Courts of Law in Ireland, and to grant certain Stamp Duties in lieu thereof.	Section One from "from and after" to "lieu thereof".
14 & 15 Vict. c. 3	Supply Act 1851	An Act to apply the Sum of Eight Millions out of the Consolidated Fund to the Service of the Year One thousand eight hundred and fifty-one.	The whole act.
14 & 15 Vict. c. 4	Appointment of Vice-Chancellor Act 1851	An Act to enable Her Majesty to appoint a Vice Chancellor in the Room of Sir James Wigram, resigned.	The whole act.
14 & 15 Vict. c. 5	Marine Mutiny Act 1851	An Act for the Regulation of Her Majesty's Royal Marine Forces while on shore.	The whole act.
14 & 15 Vict. c. 6	Mutiny Act 1851	An Act for punishing Mutiny and Desertion, and for the better Payment of the Army and their Quarters.	The whole act.
14 & 15 Vict. c. 8	Protection of Inventions Act 1851	An Act to extend the Provisions of the Designs Act, 1850, and to give Protection from Piracy to Persons exhibiting new Inventions in the Exhibition of the Works of Industry of all Nations in One thousand eight hundred and fifty-one.	The whole act.
14 & 15 Vict. c. 9	Exchequer Bills Act 1851	An Act for raising the Sum of Seventeen millions seven hundred and fifty-six thousand six hundred Pounds by Exchequer Bills, for the Service of the Year One thousand eight hundred and fifty-one.	The whole act.
14 & 15 Vict. c. 12	Income Tax Act 1851	An Act to continue the Duties on Profits arising from Property, Professions, Trades, and Offices, and to amend the Act imposing the same.	Sections One and Two.
14 & 15 Vict. c. 17	Commons Law Courts (Ireland) Act 1851	An Act further to explain and amend an Act for the Regulation of Process and Practice in the Superior Courts of Common Law in Ireland.	The whole act.
14 & 15 Vict. c. 18	Stamps Act 1851	An Act to continue the Stamp Duties granted by an Act of the Fifth and Sixth Years of Her present Majesty to assimilate the Stamp Duties in Great Britain and Ireland, and to make Regulations for collecting and managing the same.	The whole act.
14 & 15 Vict. c. 19	Prevention of Offences Act 1851	An Act for the better Prevention of Offences.	Sections Ten and Eleven.
14 & 15 Vict. c. 21	Bridges (Ireland) Act 1851	An Act the title of which begins with the words,—An Act to amend an Act of the Sixth and Seventh Years,—and ends with the words,—Bridges, and the Tolls to be paid for passing the same, in certain Cases.	Section Five.
14 & 15 Vict. c. 22	Survey, Great Britain Act 1851	An Act to continue the Survey of Great Britain, Berwick-upon-Tweed, and the Isle of Man.	The whole act.
14 & 15 Vict. c. 26	Herring Fishery Act 1851	An Act to amend the Acts relating to the British White Herring Fishery.	Section One. Section Four to "repealed; and".
14 & 15 Vict. c. 28	Common Lodging Houses Act 1851	An Act for the well-ordering of Common Lodging Houses.	Sections Three and Four so far as they relate to Ireland. Sections Six and Eight. The Schedule.
14 & 15 Vict. c. 29	Ecclesiastical Jurisdiction Act 1851	An Act for further continuing certain temporary Provisions concerning Ecclesiastical Jurisdiction in England.	The whole act.
14 & 15 Vict. c. 30	Highway Rates Act 1851	An Act to continue an Act for authorizing the Application of Highway Rates to Turnpike Roads.	The whole act.
14 & 15 Vict. c. 31	Loan Societies Act 1851	An Act to continue an Act to amend the Laws relating to Loan Societies.	The whole act.
14 & 15 Vict. c. 32	Militia Ballots Suspension Act 1851	An Act to suspend the making of Lists and the Ballots and Enrolments for the Militia of the United Kingdom.	The whole act.
14 & 15 Vict. c. 34	Labouring Classes Lodging Houses Act 1851	An Act to encourage the Establishment of Lodging Houses for the Labouring Classes.	Section Three from "elected under an Act passed in the Fifty-ninth" to "Poor, or". Section Four. Section Five to "March". Section Thirty-one, the words "and also with the Approval of the General Board of Health," (wherever they occur). Section Thirty-two. Sections Thirty-five, Thirty-eight, Forty-two, and Forty-three, so far as they relate to the approval of the General Board of Health.
14 & 15 Vict. c. 36	House Tax Act 1851	An Act to repeal the Duties payable on Houses according to the Number of Windows or Lights, and to grant in lieu thereof other Duties on Inhabited Houses according to their annual Value.	Section One to "Scotland," and from "and shall" to "repealed,". Sections Four to Six.
14 & 15 Vict. c. 37	Annual Turnpike Acts Continuance Act 1851	An Act to continue certain Turnpike Acts in Great Britain.	The whole act.
14 & 15 Vict. c. 39	Rating of Small Tenements Act 1851	An Act to exempt Burgesses and Freemen in certain Cases from the Operation of an Act for the better assessing and collecting the Poor Rates and Highway Rates in respect of Small Tenements.	The whole act.
14 & 15 Vict. c. 40	Marriages, India Act 1851	An Act for Marriages in India.	Repealed as to all Her Majesty's Dominions.
14 & 15 Vict. c. 41	Chief Justice's Salary Act 1851	An Act to regulate the Salaries of the Chief Justice of the Court of Queen's Bench and the Chief Justice of the Court of Common Pleas.	All words within parentheses.
14 & 15 Vict. c. 42	Crown Lands Act 1851	An Act to make better Provision for the Management of the Woods, Forests, and Land Revenues of the Crown, and for the Direction of Public Works and Buildings.	Section Four to "repealed, and". Section Six to "repealed; and". Section Nine. Section Ten to "repealed; and". Sections Eighteen and Nineteen. Section Twenty from "and no" to end of that Section. Section Twenty-two, the words "The Treasury Plot". Section Twenty-four. Section Twenty-nine to "Public Buildings, and" and from "and all Government" to end of that Section. Sections Twenty-nine to Thirty-one, and Forty-one.
14 & 15 Vict. c. 44	Turnpike Acts Continuance (Ireland) Act 1851	An Act to continue certain Acts for regulating Turnpike Roads in Ireland.	The whole act.
14 & 15 Vict. c. 45	Lunatic Asylums (Ireland) Act 1851	An Act to continue an Act of the Fifth and Sixth Years of Her present Majesty for amending the Law relative to Private Lunatic Asylums in Ireland.	The whole act.
14 & 15 Vict. c. 47	Poor Rates Act 1851	An Act to continue the Exemption of Inhabitants from Liability to be rated as such in respect of Stock in Trade or other Property to the Relief of the Poor.	The whole act.
14 & 15 Vict. c. 48	Unlawful Oaths (Ireland) Act 1851	An Act the title of which begins with the words,—An Act to continue an Act of the Second and Third Years,—and ends with the words,—unlawful Oaths in Ireland, as the same is amended by an Act of the Eleventh and Twelfth Years of Her Majesty's Reign.	The whole act.
14 & 15 Vict. c. 49	Preliminary Inquiries Act 1851	An Act to repeal an Act of the Eleventh and Twelfth Years of Her present Majesty, for making preliminary Inquiries in certain Cases of Applications for Local Acts, and to make other Provisions in lieu thereof.	Section One.
14 & 15 Vict. c. 50	Tithe Rating Act 1851	An Act to amend the Public Health Act, and an Act of the Third and Fourth Years of King William the Fourth in respect of the Assessment of Tithe and Tithe Rentcharges for certain Purposes.	From "and under" to end.
14 & 15 Vict. c. 51	Loans for Public Works (Ireland) Act 1851	An Act to authorize for a further Period the Application of Money for the Purposes of Loans for carrying on Public Works in Ireland.	The whole act.
14 & 15 Vict. c. 55	Criminal Justice Administration Act 1851	An Act to amend the Law relating to the Expenses of Prosecutions, and to make further Provision for the Apprehension and Trial of Offenders in certain cases.	Sections One, Three, Four, and Seventeen. Section Nineteen from "and whenever" to "Common Gaol of such adjoining County". Section Twenty from "and the Keeper" to "Gaol of such County". Section Twenty-one from "without" to "Purpose,". Section Twenty-two.
14 & 15 Vict. c. 56	Charities (Service of Notice) Act 1851	An Act to sanction the Service by Post of Notices relative to the Proceedings of certain charitable Institutions, and to make further Provision as to the Service of such Notices in Ireland.	Section One.
14 & 15 Vict. c. 57	Civil Bill Courts (Ireland) Act 1851	An Act to consolidate and amend the Laws relating to Civil Bills and the Courts of Quarter Sessions in Ireland, and to transfer to the Assistant Barristers certain Jurisdiction as to Insolvent Debtors.	Section One. Section Two to "has held the same; and". Sections Five and Forty-seven. Sections Ninety-eight from "together" to end of that Section. Sections One hundred and fifteen, One hundred and twenty, One hundred and twenty-two to One hundred and twenty-four, One hundred and forty-three, One hundred and forty-nine, One hundred and fifty-six, and One hundred and sixty. Section One hundred and sixty-one to "mentioned;" and the words "and to be remunerated in like Manner,". Schedule A. Schedule B. from "Henry Kemmis" to "£900 per Annum", from "The present" to "£1,000 per Annum", and from "The present" (where those words next occur) to "£1,200 per Annum". The rest of this Act so far as it relates to the Chairman of the Sessions of the Peace for the county of Dublin. And from the 1st day of August 1877,— Sections One hundred and fifteen and One hundred and seventeen.
14 & 15 Vict. c. 58	Militia Pay Act 1851	An Act the title of which begins with the words,—An Act to defray the Charge of the Pay,—and ends with the words,—Militia; and to authorize the Employment of the Non-commissioned Officers.	The whole act.
14 & 15 Vict. c. 59	Soap Duties Allowances Act 1851	An Act to continue and amend the Allowances of the Duty of Excise on Soap used in Manufactures.	The whole act.
14 & 15 Vict. c. 64	Railway Regulation Act 1851	An Act to repeal certain Acts for constituting Commissioners of Railways.	Section One to "repealed, and", and from "and all Proceedings" to end of that Section. Section Three from "after" to "October".
14 & 15 Vict. c. 65	Grand Jury Cess (Dublin) Act 1851	An Act the title of which begins with the words,—An Act to continue certain temporary Provisions,—and ends with the words,—Grand Jury Cess and other Purposes.	Sections One and Three.
14 & 15 Vict. c. 67	Gunpowder in Mersey Act 1851	An Act the title of which begins with the words,—An Act to repeal so much of an Act of the Twelfth Year,—and ends with the words,—temporary Provisions with regard to the said Magistrates and Stores.	Sections One and Two. Section Three from "and subject to such" to end of that Section. Sections Seven to Eleven.
14 & 15 Vict. c. 68	Poor Relief (Ireland) Act 1851	An Act to provide for the better Distribution, Support, and Management of Medical Charities in Ireland; and to amend an Act of the Eleventh Year of Her Majesty, to provide for the Execution of the Laws for Relief of the Poor in Ireland.	Section Six to "may appear necessary; and". Sections Thirteen, Fourteen, and Twenty-two.
14 & 15 Vict. c. 69	Sheep, etc., Diseases Act 1851	An Act to continue an Act of the Twelfth Year of Her present Majesty, to prevent the spreading of contagious or infectious Diseases among Sheep, Cattle, and other Animals.	The whole act.
14 & 15 Vict. c. 70	Railways Act (Ireland) 1851	An Act to alter and amend certain Provisions of the Lands Clauses Consolidation Act, 1845, so far as relates to Ireland.	Section Thirty-two.
14 & 15 Vict. c. 71	Church of Ireland Acts Repeal Act 1851	An Act to repeal certain Statutes relating to the Irish Branch of the United Church of England and Ireland.	The whole act.
14 & 15 Vict. c. 75	Metropolitan Sewers Act 1851	An Act to amend and continue the Metropolitan Sewers Acts.	The whole act.
14 & 15 Vict. c. 77	Battersea Park Act 1851	An Act to alter and extend the Powers of an Act of the Ninth and Tenth Years of Her Majesty's Reign, intituled An Act to empower the Commissioners of Her Majesty's Woods to form a Royal Park in Battersea Fields in the County of Surrey.	Section Fourteen.
14 & 15 Vict. c. 78	Coalwhippers (Port of London) Act 1851	An Act to continue and amend an Act for establishing an Office for the Benefit of the Coalwhippers of the Port of London.	The whole act.
14 & 15 Vict. c. 82	Great Seal Act 1851	An Act to simplify the Forms of Appointments to certain Offices, and the Manner of passing Grants under the Great Seal.	Sections One, Three, Four, and Ten.
14 & 15 Vict. c. 83	Court of Chancery Act 1851	An Act to improve the Administration of Justice in the Court of Chancery and in the Judicial Committee of the Privy Council.	Section Four and Eleven. Section Twelve from "shall fix" to "generally", and the words "dividing and". Section Sixteen to "repealed; and". Section Seventeen to "make up the net yearly Sum of Ten thousand Pounds; and", and from "on or before" to "fifty-one, and". Section Eighteen to "Chapter Forty-six" and from "out" to "Act,". Section Twenty from "and such Annuity shall be issued" to "thereupon;". Section Twenty-two from "Fund placed" to "or the other", and from "and also, so long" to end of that Section. Section Twenty-three from "the said" to "Fund, or", the word "other", and from "and on" to "March,". And from the commencement of the "Supreme Court of Judicature Act, 1873,"— Sections One, Five, Six, Eight, Nine, Thirteen, and Fourteen. And from the commencement of Section Twenty of the "Supreme Court of Judicature Act, 1873,"— Section Ten.
14 & 15 Vict. c. 85	Constabulary (Ireland) Act 1851	An Act further to amend an Act of the Sixth Year of King William the Fourth, to consolidate and amend the Laws relating to the Constabulary Force in Ireland.	Section One to "Fund;". Section Four to "repealed; and", and from "Provided also" to end of that Section.
14 & 15 Vict. c. 88	Solicitors Act 1851	An Act for making Log Books of several Acts for the Regulation of Attorneys and Solicitors.	Except Section Four.
14 & 15 Vict. c. 90	Fines Act (Ireland) 1851	An Act for the better Collection of Fines, Penalties, Issues, Amerciaments, and forfeited Recognizances in Ireland.	Sections Nineteen and Twenty-one.
14 & 15 Vict. c. 92	Summary Jurisdiction (Ireland) Act 1851	An Act to consolidate and amend the Acts relating to certain Offences and other Matters as to which Justices of the Peace exercise Summary Jurisdiction in Ireland.	Section Nine, Clause Six, the words "or Turnpike Gate," (wherever they occur). Sections Twenty-six and Twenty-seven.
14 & 15 Vict. c. 93	Petty Sessions (Ireland) Act 1851	An Act to consolidate and amend the Acts regulating the Proceedings at Petty Sessions, and the Duties of Justices of the Peace out of Quarter Sessions, in Ireland.	Sections Forty-three and Forty-six.
14 & 15 Vict. c. 97	Church Building Act 1851	An Act to amend the Church Building Acts.	Section Fourteen from "provided" to end of that Section. Section Nineteen from "and the vesting" to "Act". Section Twenty-three. Section Twenty-five from "and the Minister" to "reason thereof,".
14 & 15 Vict. c. 99	Evidence Act 1851	An Act to amend the Law of Evidence.	Sections One, Twelve, and Twenty as to all Her Majesty's Dominions. Sections Eleven and Nineteen so far as they relate to British India.
14 & 15 Vict. c. 100	Criminal Procedure Act 1851	An Act for further improving the Administration of Criminal Justice.	Sections Ten, Twenty-six, and Thirty-one.
14 & 15 Vict. c. 101	Appropriation Act 1851	An Act to apply a Sum out of the Consolidated Fund, and certain other Sums, to the Service of the Year One thousand eight hundred and fifty-one; and to appropriate the Supplies granted in this Session of Parliament.	The whole act.
14 & 15 Vict. c. 102	Seamen's Fund Winding-up Act 1851	An Act to amend the Acts relating to the Merchant Seamen's Fund, and to provide for winding up the said Fund, and for the better Management thereof in the meantime.	Section Three. Section Four from "and the Two" to "Execution of this Act,". Section Fifteen. Section Twenty from "but any" to end of that Section. Sections Twenty-three, Thirty-nine, and Forty. Section Forty-five to "United Kingdom; and". Section Fifty from "and the said President" to end of that Section. Section Fifty-nine from "Parts One," to "Five.".
14 & 15 Vict. c. 105	Poor Law Amendment Act 1851	An Act to continue an Act of the Fourteenth Year of Her Majesty for charging the Maintenance of certain poor Persons in Unions in England and Wales upon the Common Fund; and to make certain Amendments in the Laws for the Relief of the Poor.	Section One. Section Six from "any Part" to "Building" (where that word next occurs). The Schedule.
14 & 15 Vict. c. 106	St. Alban's Bribery Commission Act 1851	An Act for appointing Commissioners to inquire into the Existence of Bribery in the Borough of St. Alban.	The whole act.
15 & 16 Vict. c. 1	Supply Act 1852	An Act to apply the Sum of Eight Millions out of the Consolidated Fund to the Service of the Year One thousand eight hundred and fifty-five.	The whole act.
15 & 16 Vict. c. 3	Estates of Intestates, etc. Act 1852	An Act to provide for the Administration of Personal Estates of Intestates which Her Majesty may be entitled in right of Her Prerogative or in right of Her Duchy of Lancaster.	Section Two.
15 & 16 Vict. c. 5	Municipal Corporations Act 1852	An Act further to explain and amend the Acts for the Regulation of Municipal Corporations in England and Wales, and in Ireland.	Section One, the words "to have had or", "having had or", and "may have been or". Sections Two to Five. Section Six, the words "to have been or", "having had or", "may have been or", "to have been and", and from "unless" to "Act" under "The Protection of Inventions Act, 1851."
15 & 16 Vict. c. 6	Protection of Inventions Act 1852	An Act for extending the Term of the provisional Registration of Inventions under "The Protection of Inventions Act, 1851."	The whole act.
15 & 16 Vict. c. 7	Mutiny Act 1852	An Act for punishing Mutiny and Desertion, and for the better Payment of the Army and their Quarters.	The whole act.
15 & 16 Vict. c. 8	Marine Mutiny Act 1852	An Act for the Regulation of Her Majesty's Royal Marine Forces while on shore.	The whole act.
15 & 16 Vict. c. 9	Disfranchisement of St. Alban's Act 1852	An Act to disfranchise the Borough of Saint Alban.	The whole act.
15 & 16 Vict. c. 10	Exchequer Bills Act 1852	An Act for raising the Sum of Seventeen millions seven hundred and forty-two thousand eight hundred Pounds by Exchequer Bills, for the Service of the Year One thousand eight hundred and fifty-two.	The whole act.
15 & 16 Vict. c. 11	Sheep, etc., Disorders Prevention Act 1852	An Act to continue an Act of the Twelfth Year of Her present Majesty to prevent the spreading of contagious or infectious Disorders among Sheep, Cattle, and other Animals.	The whole act.
15 & 16 Vict. c. 12	International Copyright Act 1852	An Act to enable Her Majesty to carry into effect a Convention with France on the Subject of Copyright; to extend and explain the International Copyright Acts; and to explain the Acts relating to Copyright in Engravings.	Sections Twelve and Thirteen.
15 & 16 Vict. c. 13	Linen, etc., Manufacturers (Ireland) Act 1852	An Act to amend and continue certain Acts relating to Linen, Hempen, and other Manufactures in Ireland.	The whole act.
15 & 16 Vict. c. 14	Poor Law Union Charges Act 1852	An Act to continue an Act of the Fifteenth Year of Her present Majesty, for charging the Maintenance of certain poor Persons in Unions in England and Wales upon the Common Fund.	The whole act.
15 & 16 Vict. c. 15	Loan Societies Act 1852	An Act to continue an Act to amend the Laws relating to Loan Societies.	The whole act.
15 & 16 Vict. c. 17	Ecclesiastical Jurisdiction Act 1852	An Act for further continuing certain temporary Provisions concerning Ecclesiastical Jurisdiction in England.	The whole act.
15 & 16 Vict. c. 18	Poor Rates Act 1852	An Act to continue the Exemption of Inhabitants from Liability to be rated as such in respect of Stock in Trade or other Property to the Relief of the Poor.	The whole act.
15 & 16 Vict. c. 19	Highway Rates Act 1852	An Act to continue an Act for authorizing the Application of Highway Rates to Turnpike Roads.	The whole act.
15 & 16 Vict. c. 20	Income Tax Act 1852	An Act to continue the Duties on Profits arising from Property, Professions, Trades, and Offices.	The whole act.
15 & 16 Vict. c. 21	Stamps Act 1852	An Act to continue the Stamp Duties granted by an Act of the Fifth and Sixth Years of Her present Majesty, to assimilate the Stamp Duties in Great Britain and Ireland, and to make Regulations for collecting and managing the same.	The whole act.
15 & 16 Vict. c. 22	Turnpike Acts (Ireland) Act 1852	An Act to continue certain Acts for regulating Turnpike Roads in Ireland.	The whole act.
15 & 16 Vict. c. 26	Foreign Deserters Act 1852	An Act to enable Her Majesty to carry into effect Arrangements made with Foreign Powers for the Apprehension of Seamen who desert from their Ships.	Section One from "or the" to "Company,". Section Two from "or in" to "Company". Repealed as to all Her Majesty's Dominions.
15 & 16 Vict. c. 32	Burghs (Scotland) Act 1852	An Act to alter and amend certain Provisions in the Laws relating to the Number and Election of Magistrates and Councillors in the Burghs in Scotland.	Sections Seven to Nine.
15 & 16 Vict. c. 37	Poor Law Commission (Ireland) Act 1852	An Act to continue the Poor Law Commission for Ireland.	The whole act.
15 & 16 Vict. c. 47	Differential Duties on Foreign Ships Act 1852	An Act to enable Her Majesty to abolish, otherwise than by Treaty, on Condition of Reciprocity, Differential Duties on Foreign Ships.	The whole act.
15 & 16 Vict. c. 51	Copyhold Act 1852	An Act to extend the Provisions of the Acts for the Commutation of Manorial Rights, and for the gradual Enfranchisement of Lands of Copyhold and Customary Tenure.	The Schedule, No. 1.
15 & 16 Vict. c. 54	County Courts Act 1852	An Act further to facilitate and arrange Proceedings in the County Courts.	Section Two to "repealed; and" and from "now" to "therefor". Section Ten to "repealed; and". Sections Eleven to Fourteen. Section Sixteen to "Act". Sections Seventeen and Nineteen.
15 & 16 Vict. c. 55	Trustee Act 1852	An Act to extend the Provisions of "The Trustee Act, 1850."	Section Two to "repealed; and".
15 & 16 Vict. c. 56	Pharmacy Act 1852	An Act for regulating the Qualifications of Pharmaceutical Chemists.	Section Two from "Provided also" to end of that Section. Section Three. Section Four from "within" to "passing of this Act,".
15 & 16 Vict. c. 57	Election Commissioners Act 1852	An Act to provide for more effectual Inquiry into the Existence of corrupt Practices at Elections for Members to serve in Parliament.	Section Fifteen from "which said Payments" to end of that Section. Repealed so long as 31 & 32 Vict. c. 125. s. 15. and 32 & 33 Vict. c. 21. continue in force.
15 & 16 Vict. c. 58	Annual Turnpike Acts Continuance Act 1852	An Act to continue certain Turnpike Acts in Great Britain.	The whole act.
15 & 16 Vict. c. 59	Poor Law Boards (England) Act 1852	An Act to continue the Poor Law Board.	The whole act.
15 & 16 Vict. c. 60	Savings Banks Act 1852	An Act to continue an Act of the Twelfth Year of Her present Majesty for amending the Laws relating to Savings Banks in Ireland.	The whole act.
15 & 16 Vict. c. 63	Valuation (Ireland) Act 1852	An Act to amend the Laws relating to the Valuation of rateable Property in Ireland.	Sections One to Nine and Twenty-five. Section Twenty-six from "Provided always" to end of that Section. Section Twenty-seven from "Provided" to end of that Section. Section Thirty-four from "Provided always" to end of that Section. Section Forty-six. The Forms annexed to this Act.
15 & 16 Vict. c. 64	Metropolitan Sewers Act 1852	An Act to continue and amend the Metropolitan Sewers Act.	The whole act.
15 & 16 Vict. c. 66	Crime and Outrage (Ireland) Act 1852	An Act to continue an Act of the Eleventh Year of Her present Majesty, for the better Prevention of Crime and Outrage in certain Parts of Ireland.	The whole act.
15 & 16 Vict. c. 67	Incumbered Estates (Ireland) Act 1852	An Act to continue the Powers of applying for a Sale of Lands under the Act for facilitating the Sale and Transfer of Incumbered Estates in Ireland.	The whole act.
15 & 16 Vict. c. 68	Distressed Unions (Ireland) Act 1852	An Act for applying Money secured from Fines and Forfeitures in Ireland in aid of certain distressed Unions and Electoral Divisions in that Country.	The whole act.
15 & 16 Vict. c. 73	Common Law Courts Act 1852	An Act the title of which begins with the words,—An Act to make Provision for a permanent Establishment of Officers to perform the Duties at Nisi Prius,—and ends with the words,—Offices in those Courts.	Section One to "abolished; and". Section Two from "and the Officers" to end of that Section. Section Seven, the words "to the Marshal of the Senior Judge". Section Ten from "provided" to end of that Section. Section Eleven from "Provided" to end of that Section. Sections Sixteen to Eighteen. Section Thirty from "shall, as the" to "aforesaid, or" and the word "otherwise". Section Thirty-one to "abolished; and". Section Thirty-two from "from and" to "of Messengers of the Exchequer,". Schedule (C.). And from the commencement of the "Supreme Court of Judicature Act, 1873,"— Section Eight.
15 & 16 Vict. c. 74	Militia Pay Act 1852	An Act the title of which begins with the words,—An Act to defray the Charge of the Pay,—and ends with the words,—and to authorize the Employment of the Non-commissioned Officers.	The whole act.
15 & 16 Vict. c. 75	Militia Ballots Suspension Act 1852	An Act to suspend the making of Lists and the Ballots and Enrolments for the Militia of the United Kingdom.	The whole act.
15 & 16 Vict. c. 76	Common Law Procedure Act 1852	An Act to amend the Process, Practice, and Mode of Pleading in the Superior Courts of Common Law at Westminster, and in the Superior Courts of the Counties Palatine of Lancaster and Durham.	Sections One, Ten, Twenty-four, Twenty-six, Ninety-two, One hundred, and One hundred and four. Section One hundred and forty-two, the words "or Insolvency". Section Two hundred and thirty from "except" to "Pleading,". Section Two hundred and thirty-four. And from the commencement of the "Supreme Court of Judicature Act, 1873,"— Sections Two hundred and twenty-three, Two hundred and thirty-one, and Two hundred and thirty-three.
15 & 16 Vict. c. 80	Master in Chancery Abolition Act 1852	An Act to abolish the Office of Master in Ordinary of the High Court of Chancery, and to make Provision for the more speedy and efficient Despatch of Business in the said Court.	Sections One to Four and Seven to Ten. Section Eleven to "confirmed;". Section Seventeen from "have been Chief" to "Court, or", and from "Provided" to end of that Section. Section Twenty-four. Section Twenty-six, the words "or Claims". Section Twenty-nine to "and fifty-two". Sections Thirty-five, Thirty-seven, and Thirty-nine. Section Forty to "and fifty-two". Section Forty-four from "and to every" to "fifty Pounds;", from "and to direct" to "Three hundred Pounds;", from "to any such" to "either Case," the words "or Junior Clerk", and from "Provided also" to end of that Section. Section Forty-five from "to be paid and" to end of that Section. Section Forty-seven. Section Fifty-five from "and paid" to "Manner,". Section Fifty-six from "and such Salary" to end of that Section. Section Fifty-eight. And from the commencement of the "Supreme Court of Judicature Act, 1873,"— Section Fifty-two, and Section Fifty-three, so far as it in any manner applies any repealed part of 5 Vict. c. 5.
15 & 16 Vict. c. 81	County Rates Act 1852	An Act to consolidate and amend the Statutes relating to the Assessment and Collection of County Rates in England and Wales.	Section One. Section Fifty-two from "or under an Act" to "Employment of the Poor."
15 & 16 Vict. c. 82	Appropriation Act 1852	An Act to apply a Sum out of the Consolidated Fund, and certain other Sums, to the Service of the Year One thousand eight hundred and fifty-two, and to appropriate the Supplies granted in this Session of Parliament.	The whole act.
15 & 16 Vict. c. 84	Metropolis Water Act 1852	An Act to make better Provision respecting the Supply of Water to the Metropolis.	Section One to "and fifty-five", the words "except the Governor and Company of Chelsea Waterworks", and from "and from and" to end of that Section. Section Two to "and fifty-five". Section Three to "and fifty-five,". Section Four to "and fifty-five,". Section Twenty-six, the words "with the Approval of the Board of Trade".
15 & 16 Vict. c. 85	Burial Act 1852	An Act to amend the Laws concerning the Burial of the Dead in the Metropolis.	Section One. Section Two from "or where" to "Seven Days". Sections Twelve and Forty-seven. Section Fifty-two from "elected under an Act of the" to "Poor," or.
15 & 16 Vict. c. 86	Court of Chancery Procedure Act 1852	An Act to amend the Practice and Course of Proceeding in the High Court of Chancery.	Section One to "discontinued; and". Section Two. Section Seven to "Provided always, that". Section Twenty-eight to "Provided always, that,". Section Thirty-three to "hour; and". Section Forty-three, Sixty-one and Sixty-seven. The rest of the Act so far as it relates to claims.
15 & 16 Vict. c. 87	Suitors in Chancery Relief Act 1852	An Act for the Relief of the Suitors of the High Court of Chancery.	Section One to "and fifty-two" (where those words first occur), to from "after the" (where those words next occur) to "fifty-two". Section Three to "and fifty-two,". Section Five to "cease; and". Section Sixteen from "shall be in lieu" to "force, and", the word "quarterly", and from "on the" to end of that Section. Section Twenty-three from "the following" to "Deputy Sealer, and", and from "and the respective" to end of that Section. Section Twenty-four to "and fifty-two,". Section Twenty-five to "and fifty-two". Section Twenty-six to "and fifty-two", and from "and such yearly" to end of that Section. Section Twenty-nine to "and fifty-two". Section Thirty-five and Forty. Section Forty-nine from "the Keeper", to "the Manager", the words "Deputy Chaff Wax, Sealer", and from "the First to" to "any such Compensation,".
16 & 17 Vict. c. 1	Bills and Notes, Metropolis Act 1852	An Act to make Provision concerning Bills of Exchange and Promissory Notes payable in the Metropolis on the Day appointed for the Funeral of Arthur late Duke of Wellington.	The whole act.
16 & 17 Vict. c. 4	South American Loans Guarantee Act 1852	An Act to amend an Act for guaranteeing Interest on such Loans, not exceeding Five hundred thousand Pounds, as may be raised by the British Colonies on the Continent of South America, in the West Indies, and the Mauritius, for certain Purposes.	Repealed as to all Her Majesty's Dominions.
16 & 17 Vict. c. 6	Transfer of Aids Act 1853	An Act to apply the Sum of Two Millions to the Service of the Year One thousand eight hundred and fifty-three.	The whole act.
16 & 17 Vict. c. 9	Mutiny Act 1853	An Act for punishing Mutiny and Desertion, and for the better Payment of the Army and their Quarters.	The whole act.
16 & 17 Vict. c. 10	Marine Mutiny Act 1853	An Act for the Regulation of Her Majesty's Royal Marine Forces while on shore.	The whole act.
16 & 17 Vict. c. 12	Supply Act 1853	An Act to apply the Sum of Eight Millions out of the Consolidated Fund to the Service of the Year One thousand eight hundred and fifty-three.	The whole act.
16 & 17 Vict. c. 13	Grand Jury Cess (Ireland) Act 1853	An Act to revive certain temporary Provisions relating to the Collection of Grand Jury Cess in Ireland.	The whole act.
16 & 17 Vict. c. 19	New Forest Deer Removal Act 1853	An Act to amend an Act of the Fifteenth Year of Her present Majesty (for Forest Deer Removal), as regards the Publication of Claims, and preferring and delivering Objections thereto.	The whole act.
16 & 17 Vict. c. 20	Evidence (Scotland) Act 1853	An Act to alter and amend an Act of the Fifteenth Year of Her present Majesty, for amending the Law of Evidence in Scotland.	Sections One and Two.
16 & 17 Vict. c. 22	Court of Chancery Examiners Act 1853	An Act for making further Provision for the Execution of the Office of Examiner of the High Court of Chancery.	Section Three, the words "out of the Fund entitled 'The Suitors Fee Fund'" and the words "out of the aforesaid Suitors Fee Fund".
16 & 17 Vict. c. 25	Exchequer Bills Act 1853	An Act for raising the Sum of Seventeen millions seven hundred and fifty-two thousand five hundred Pounds by Exchequer Bills, for the Service of the Year One thousand eight hundred and fifty-three.	The whole act.
16 & 17 Vict. c. 29	Weights in Sales of Bullion Act 1853	An Act for regulating the Weights used in Sales of Bullion.	Section Three.
16 & 17 Vict. c. 31	Supply (No. 2) Act 1853	An Act to apply the Sum of Four Millions out of the Consolidated Fund to the Service of the Year One thousand eight hundred and fifty-three.	The whole act.
16 & 17 Vict. c. 34	Income Tax Act 1853	An Act for granting to Her Majesty Duties on Profits arising from Property, Professions, Trades, and Offices.	Section One. Section Twelve from "within" to "succeeding Year," and the words "and within the same Period in each Year". Section Twenty-seven. Section Twenty-eight, from "Provided always" to "as the case may require". Section Forty from "under this Act" to "as the case may be". Sections Forty-four, Forty-five, Forty-seven, and Fifty-nine.
16 & 17 Vict. c. 36	Whichwood Disafforesting Act 1853	An Act to make Provision concerning the future Regulation of certain Appointments connected with Cathedral and Collegiate Churches, and concerning certain of the Estates of the Dean and Chapters of York and Ely.	The whole act.
16 & 17 Vict. c. 37	Duties on Spirits, etc. Act 1853	An Act the title of which begins with the words,—An Act to impose additional Duties on Spirits,—and ends with the words,—and amend the Laws relating to the collecting and securing the Duties of Excise upon Spirits.	The whole act.
16 & 17 Vict. c. 38	Malicious Injuries (Ireland) Act 1853	An Act to extend the Remedies for the Compensation of malicious Injuries to Property in Ireland.	Section Two.
16 & 17 Vict. c. 39	Soap Duties Repeal Act 1853	An Act to repeal the Duties, Allowances, and Drawbacks of Excise on Soap.	The whole act.
16 & 17 Vict. c. 45	Government Annuities Act 1853	An Act to consolidate and amend the Laws and to grant additional Facilities in relation to the Purchase of Government Annuities through the Medium of Savings Banks, and to make other Provisions in respect thereof.	Section Ten from "provided" to the end of that Section. Section Sixteen from "Provided also" to the end of that Section.
16 & 17 Vict. c. 50	Ecclesiastical Commissioners (Exchange of Patronage) Act 1853	An Act to effect Exchanges of Patronage by Archbishops, Bishops, and other Ecclesiastical corporations.	Section Three from "to be appointed" to "Chapter Five".
16 & 17 Vict. c. 55	Taxing Officer (Ireland) Act 1853	An Act to make better Provision for the efficient Discharge of the Duties of the Taxing Officer of the Court for the Common Law Business in Ireland.	Section One. Section One from "is hereby repealed" to end of that Section.
16 & 17 Vict. c. 58	Dublin Parliamentary Revising Act (1853)	An Act to authorise the Appointment of Barristers for the Purpose of effecting a complete annual Revision of Lists and Registry of Voters for the City of Dublin, and to remove Doubts as to the Rate Books for the Purposes of such Registry.	Section Two from "and each of such Substitutes" to the end of that Section.
16 & 17 Vict. c. 64	Incumbered Estates (Ireland) Act 1853	An Act for continuing and amending the Act for facilitating the Sale and Transfer of Incumbered Estates in Ireland.	Except Section Twelve.
16 & 17 Vict. c. 66	Highway Rates Act 1853	An Act to continue an Act for authorizing the Application of Highway Rates to Turnpike Roads.	The whole act.
16 & 17 Vict. c. 67	Licensing (Scotland) Act 1853	An Act for the better Regulation of Public Houses in Scotland.	Sections Three, Four, Seven, Eleven, and Twelve. Section Thirteen, from "all such licenses" to "thereof, and". Section Eighteen. The Schedule. (Note: This act was partially revived by the Statute Law Revision Act 1878 (41 & 42 Vict. c. 79): "Section eleven, to "continued in the said Schedule". Section twelve. So much of the Schedule as prescribes the form of register of applications.")
16 & 17 Vict. c. 69	Naval Enlistment Act 1853	An Act to make better Provision concerning the Entry and Service of Seamen, and otherwise to amend the Laws concerning Her Majesty's Navy.	Sections Five and Six.
16 & 17 Vict. c. 70	Lunacy Regulation Act 1853	An Act for the Regulation of Proceedings under Commissions of Lunacy, and the Consolidation and Amendment of the Acts respecting Lunatics so found by Inquisition, and their Estates.	Section Sixteen from "who shall hold" to "Visitors during pleasure". Section Nineteen. Section Twenty-two from "and the present" to "during pleasure". Sections Thirty-four to Thirty-seven, and Forty-nine.
16 & 17 Vict. c. 72	Crime and Outrage (Ireland) Act 1853	An Act to continue an Act of the Eleventh Year of Her present Majesty, for the better Prevention of Crime and Outrage in certain Parts of Ireland.	The whole act.
16 & 17 Vict. c. 73	Naval Volunteers Act 1853	An Act for the Establishment of a Body of Naval Coast Volunteers, and for the temporary Transfer to the Navy, in case of Need, of Seafaring Men employed in other Public Services.	Section Five from "but so" to "United Kingdom". Section Eighteen, the words "or in the Forces of the East India Company" (wherever they occur). Repealed as to all Her Majesty's Dominions.
16 & 17 Vict. c. 74	Land Tax Redemption Act 1853	An Act to reduce the Terms on which the Land Tax in Great Britain may be redeemed or purchased.	From "and the Consideration for the Purchase" to the end of the Act.
16 & 17 Vict. c. 75	Consolidated Annuities (Ireland) Act 1853	An Act for the Remission of the Consolidated Annuities charged upon Districts in Ireland.	The whole act.
16 & 17 Vict. c. 76	Turnpike Acts (Ireland) Act 1853	An Act to continue certain Acts for regulating Turnpike Roads in Ireland.	The whole act.
16 & 17 Vict. c. 77	Poor Law Union Charges Act 1853	An Act to continue an Act of the Fifteenth Year of Her present Majesty, for charging the Maintenance of certain poor Persons in Unions in England and Wales upon the Common Fund.	The whole act.
16 & 17 Vict. c. 79	Municipal Corporation Act 1853	An Act for making sundry Provisions with respect to Municipal Corporations in England.	Sections Four and Six. Also Section Twelve, but as to this section so long only as 35 & 36 Vict. c. 33. continues in force.
16 & 17 Vict. c. 80	Sheriff Courts (Scotland) Act 1853	An Act to facilitate Procedure in the Sheriff's Courts in Scotland.	Section Twenty-four from "and the Provisions of an Act" to the end of that Section. Section Twenty-five. Section Forty-six from "and so much" to the end of that Section. Sections Fifty-one and Fifty-two.
16 & 17 Vict. c. 83	Evidence Amendment Act 1853	An Act to amend an Act of the Fourteenth and Fifteenth Victoria, Chapter Ninety-nine.	Sections Four and Six.
16 & 17 Vict. c. 84	Passengers Act Amendment Act 1853	An Act to amend the Passengers Act, 1852, so far as relates to the Passages of Natives of Asia or Africa, and also Passages between the Island of Ceylon and certain Parts of the East Indies.	Section Three.
16 & 17 Vict. c. 89	Universities (Scotland) Act 1853	An Act to regulate the Admission of Professors to the Law Chairs in the Universities of Scotland.	Section Seven to "whatsoever".
16 & 17 Vict. c. 91	Income Tax (Insurance) Act 1853	An Act to extend for a limited Time the Provision for Abatement of Income Tax in respect of Insurances on Lives.	Section Two.
16 & 17 Vict. c. 93	Burgh Harbours (Scotland) Act 1853	An Act to enable Burghs in Scotland to maintain and improve their Harbours.	Section Ten.
16 & 17 Vict. c. 94	Entail Amendment Act 1853	An Act to extend the Benefits of the Act of the Eleventh and Twelfth Years of Her present Majesty, for the Amendment of the Law of Entail in Scotland.	Section Eleven.
16 & 17 Vict. c. 96	Care and Treatment of Lunatics Act 1853	An Act to amend an Act passed in the Ninth Year of Her Majesty, "for the Regulation of the Care and Treatment of Lunatics".	Section Three. Section Thirty-five to "repealed, and" and from "in the same manner" to the end of that Section.
16 & 17 Vict. c. 97	Lunatic Asylums Act 1853	An Act to consolidate and amend the Laws for the Provision and Regulation of Lunatic Asylums for Counties and Boroughs, and for the Maintenance and Care of Pauper Lunatics, in England.	Section One from "or prevent" to "incurred", and from "and every such" to "continued". Section Six. Section Sixty-six, the words "according to the Form in the Schedule (E.) to this Act". Section Sixty-seven, the words "and a proper Person to be sent to an Asylum" (where they secondly occur). Section One hundred and thirty from "incurred" to "or hereafter," from "as long" to "Common Fund of Unions", and from "and Section Five" to the end of that Section. Schedule (E).
16 & 17 Vict. c. 99	Penal Servitude Act 1853	An Act to substitute, in certain Cases, other Punishment in lieu of Transportation.	Section Eleven from "to the Prison" to "of the said Licence".
16 & 17 Vict. c. 103	Linen, etc., Manufacturers (Ireland) Act 1853	An Act to amend and continue certain Acts relating to Linen, Hempen, and other Manufactures in Ireland.	The whole act.
16 & 17 Vict. c. 105	Poor Rates Act 1853	An Act to continue the Exemption of Inhabitants from Liability to be rated as such in respect of Stock in Trade or other Property to the Relief of the Poor.	The whole act.
16 & 17 Vict. c. 107	Customs Consolidation Act 1853	An Act to amend and consolidate the Laws relating to the Customs of the United Kingdom and of the Isle of Man, and certain Laws relating to Trade and Navigation and the British Possessions.	Section Ten, from "and may approve" to "for exportation," and from "or in respect of any bonded" to "Duties due on such Ships". Section Twelve, the words "and of bonded Goods Houses," and from "but all existing" to the end of that Section. Sections Fifteen and Sixteen. Section Forty-one, the words "on the following Goods" and "on others", and from "viz.;" Corn," to the end of that Section. Section Seventy from "Coals" to "Pepper". Sections Eighty, Eighty-one, and Eighty-four. Section Eighty-five from "and the Importer or Person" to the end of that Section. Section One hundred and two. Section One hundred and seven from "and the Officers of Customs" to the end of that Section. Section One hundred and eight. Section One hundred and ten, the words "and Sugar". Section One hundred and thirteen. Section One hundred and fourteen from "within the meaning" to "fifty-nine, and", from "and the same" to "same Act," and from "as well as" to "last-mentioned Act". Section One hundred and fifteen, the words "bonâ fide made Castle's". Section One hundred and forty-two from "and the Shipper" to the end of that Section. Section One hundred and sixty-two to "fifty-four and". Section One hundred and seventy-three. Section Two hundred and twenty-eight from "and any Note" to the end of that Section. Section Two hundred and forty-seven from "or any Tea" to "Ten Pounds or more". Section Three hundred and thirty-four from "including" to "such Contract". Section Three hundred and fifty-three from "and, except" to the end of that Section. Sections Three hundred and fifty-four and Three hundred and fifty-five. Section Three hundred and fifty-eight. Schedule A. Repealed as to all Her Majesty's Dominions.
16 & 17 Vict. c. 108	Ecclesiastical Jurisdiction Act 1853	An Act for further continuing certain temporary Provisions concerning Ecclesiastical Jurisdiction in England.	The whole act.
16 & 17 Vict. c. 109	Loan Societies Act 1853	An Act to continue an Act to amend the Laws relating to Loan Societies.	The whole act.
16 & 17 Vict. c. 110	Appropriation Act 1853	An Act to apply a Sum out of the Consolidated Fund and the Surplus Ways and Means to the Service of the Year One thousand eight hundred and fifty-three, and to appropriate the Supplies granted in this Session of Parliament.	The whole act.
16 & 17 Vict. c. 112	Dublin Carriage Act 1853	An Act to consolidate and amend the Laws relating to Hackney and Stage Carriages, and to Hackney and Stage Carriage Drivers, within the Police District of Dublin Metropolis.	Sections One, Three, Four, and Eighty-four. Schedule (A.).
16 & 17 Vict. c. 113	Common Law Procedure Amendment Act (Ireland) 1853	An Act to amend the Procedure in the Superior Courts of Common Law in Ireland.	Section Three from "except as to anything" to the end of that Section.
16 & 17 Vict. c. 116	Militia Pay Act 1853	An Act the title of which begins with the words,—An Act to defray the Charge of the Pay,—and ends with the words,—Employment of the Non-commissioned Officers.	The whole act.
16 & 17 Vict. c. 118	Apprehension of Certain Offenders Act 1853	An Act to amend an Act of the Seventh Year of Her Majesty, for the better Apprehension of certain Offenders.	Repealed as to all Her Majesty's Dominions.
16 & 17 Vict. c. 124	Copyhold, etc., Commission Act 1853	An Act to continue Appointments under the Act for consolidating the Copyhold and Inclosure Commissions, and for completing Proceedings under the Tithe Commutation Acts.	The whole act.
16 & 17 Vict. c. 129	Pilotage Law Amendment Act 1853	An Act further to amend the Law relating to Pilotage.	Section Three, the words "notwithstanding the Repeal and Enactment herein-before contained".
16 & 17 Vict. c. 130	Drainage and Improvement of Lands (Ireland) Act 1853	An Act to amend the Act for promoting the Drainage of Lands and Improvement in connexion therewith in Ireland.	Sections Ten and Forty. The Schedule.
16 & 17 Vict. c. 133	Militia Act 1853	An Act to suspend the making of Lists and the Ballot and Enrolments for the Militia of the United Kingdom, and to amend the Law in relation to the Militia in England.	The whole act.
16 & 17 Vict. c. 135	Annual Turnpike Acts Continuance Act 1853	An Act to continue certain Turnpike Acts in Great Britain, and to make further Provisions concerning Turnpike Roads in England.	Section One and Two. The Schedule.
16 & 17 Vict. c. 136	Grand Jury (Ireland) Act 1853	An Act for enabling Grand Juries in Ireland to borrow Money from private Sources, on the Security of Presentment, and for transferring to Counties certain Works constructed wholly or in part with Public Money.	Sections Thirteen, Fourteen, and Eighteen.
16 & 17 Vict. c. 137	Charitable Trusts Act 1853	An Act for the better Administration of Charitable Trusts.	Section Twenty-seven, the words "and the Trustees of the Charity shall be legally authorized to purchase and hold such Land". Section Thirty-three from "nor shall this Act" to "control of Persons of that Persuasion". Section Sixty-four, the words "exempted from the Operation of this Act." Section Sixty-six from "the Expressions 'District Court'" to "every such District Court". And so much of the rest of the Act as relates to district courts of bankruptcy.
17 & 18 Vict. c. 2	Supply Act 1854	An Act to apply the Sum of Eight Millions out of the Consolidated Fund to the Service of the Year One thousand eight hundred and fifty-four.	The whole act.
17 & 18 Vict. c. 3	Exchequer Bills Act 1854	An Act for raising the Sum of One million seven hundred and fifty thousand Pounds by Exchequer Bills, for the Service of the Year One thousand eight hundred and fifty-four.	The whole act.
17 & 18 Vict. c. 4	Mutiny Act 1854	An Act for punishing Mutiny and Desertion, and for the better Payment of the Army and their Quarters.	The whole act.
17 & 18 Vict. c. 6	Marine Mutiny Act 1854	An Act for the Regulation of Her Majesty's Royal Marine Forces while on shore.	The whole act.
17 & 18 Vict. c. 7	Highways, South Wales Act 1854	An Act for extending the time limited for putting into execution the Act of the Fourteenth and Fifteenth Years of Her present Majesty, for the better Management and Control of Highways in South Wales.	The whole act.
17 & 18 Vict. c. 8	Valuation (Ireland) Act 1854	An Act further to amend an Act relating to the Valuation of rateable Property in Ireland.	Section One.
17 & 18 Vict. c. 10	Income Tax Act 1854	An Act for granting to Her Majesty additional Duties on Profits arising from Property, Professions, Trades, and Offices.	The whole act.
17 & 18 Vict. c. 12	Exchequer Bills Act 1854	An Act for raising the Sum of Sixteen millions twenty-four thousand six hundred Pounds by Exchequer Bills, for the Service of the Year One thousand eight hundred and fifty-four.	The whole act.
17 & 18 Vict. c. 14	Church Building Commission Act 1854	An Act to continue Her Majesty's Commission for building new Churches.	The whole act.
17 & 18 Vict. c. 16	County Courts Act 1854	An Act to amend the Act of the Thirteenth and Fourteenth Victoria, Chapter Ninety-four, and the Act of the Fifteenth and Sixteenth Victoria, Chapter Fifty-four.	The whole act.
17 & 18 Vict. c. 21	Supply Act 1854	An Act to apply the Sum of Eight Millions out of the Consolidated Fund to the Service of the Year One thousand eight hundred and fifty-four.	The whole act.
17 & 18 Vict. c. 23	Exchequer Bonds and Bills Act 1854	An Act for raising the Sum of Six Millions by Exchequer Bills and Exchequer Bills.	The whole act.
17 & 18 Vict. c. 24	Income Tax Act 1854	An Act for granting to Her Majesty an increased Rate of Duty on Profits arising from Property, Professions, Trades, and Offices.	Sections One and Two. Section Three to "Provided also, that". Sections Four, Six, and Seven.
17 & 18 Vict. c. 27	Excise Act 1854	An Act for granting certain additional Rates and Duties of Excise.	Except Section Eight.
17 & 18 Vict. c. 30	Sugar Duties Act 1854	An Act for granting certain Duties of Excise on Sugar made in the United Kingdom.	Section Four, the words "shall expire on the Tenth Day of October next after the granting thereof, and". Section Five, the words "and in the Seventh and Eighth Years of the Reign of King George the Fourth, Chapter Fifty-Five."
17 & 18 Vict. c. 35	Warwick Assizes Act 1854	An Act to repeal certain Provisions of an Act of the Fifth and Sixth Years of Her present Majesty, concerning the holding of Assizes for the County of Westmoreland.	Section Two from "and all Recognizances" to the end of that Section. Sections Three and Four.
17 & 18 Vict. c. 36	Bills of Sale Act 1854	An Act for preventing Frauds upon Creditors by secret Bills of Sale of Personal Chattels.	Section Three from "containing therein" to the end of that Section. The Schedule.
17 & 18 Vict. c. 40	Income Tax Act 1854	An Act to continue an Act of the last Session of Parliament, for extending for a limited Time the Provision for Abatement of Income Tax in respect of Insurance on Lives.	The whole act.
17 & 18 Vict. c. 41	Poor Law Board Act 1854	An Act to continue the Poor Law Board.	The whole act.
17 & 18 Vict. c. 42	Turnpike Acts (Ireland) Act 1854	An Act to continue certain Acts for regulating Turnpike Roads in Ireland.	The whole act.
17 & 18 Vict. c. 43	Poor Law Union Charges Act 1854	An Act to continue an Act of the Seventeenth Year of Her present Majesty, for charging the Maintenance of certain poor Persons in Unions in England and Wales upon the Common Fund.	The whole act.
17 & 18 Vict. c. 45	Dublin Amended Carriage Act 1854	An Act to amend the Dublin Carriage Act, 1853.	Sections One and Five. Section Seven to "and fifty-four". Section Sixteen.
17 & 18 Vict. c. 46	Linen, etc., Manufacturers (Ireland) Act 1854	An Act to continue certain Acts relating to Linen, Hempen, and other Manufactures in Ireland.	The whole act.
17 & 18 Vict. c. 50	Savings Banks and Friendly Societies Act 1854	An Act to continue an Act of the Twelfth Year of Her present Majesty for amending the Laws relating to Savings Banks in Ireland; and to authorize Friendly Societies to invest the whole of their Funds in Savings Banks.	The whole act.
17 & 18 Vict. c. 52	Highway Rates Act 1854	An Act to continue an Act for authorizing the Application of Highway Rates to Turnpike Roads.	The whole act.
17 & 18 Vict. c. 56 (Note: The text of the act does not start "in part".)	Friendly Societies Discharge Act 1854	An Act to make further Provisions in relation to certain Friendly Societies.	Section Eight from "Provided" to the end of that Section.
17 & 18 Vict. c. 58	Annual Turnpike Acts Continuance Act 1854	An Act to continue certain Turnpike Acts in Great Britain, and to make further Provisions concerning Turnpike Roads in England.	Sections One and Two. The Schedule.
17 & 18 Vict. c. 61	Royal Military Asylum, Chelsea Act 1854	An Act to authorize the Application of a Sum of Money out of the forfeited and unclaimed Army Prize Fund in enlarging and improving the Royal Military Asylum.	The whole act.
17 & 18 Vict. c. 63	Poor Law Board (Ireland) Act 1854	An Act to continue the Poor Law Commission for Ireland.	The whole act.
17 & 18 Vict. c. 65	Ecclesiastical Jurisdiction Act 1854	An Act for further continuing certain temporary Provisions concerning Ecclesiastical Jurisdiction in England.	The whole act.
17 & 18 Vict. c. 66	Poor Rates Act 1854	An Act to continue the Exemption of Inhabitants from Liability to be rated as such in respect of Stock in Trade or other Property to the Relief of the Poor.	The whole act.
17 & 18 Vict. c. 69	Local Boards Highway Repair Indemnity Act 1854	An Act to indemnify Local Boards of Health as regards rating for the Repair of Highways under the Public Health Act, 1848.	The whole act.
17 & 18 Vict. c. 72	Sheriff and Sheriff Clerk of Chancery (Scotland) Act 1854	An Act to provide for Payment of the Salaries of the Sheriff and Sheriff Clerk of Chancery in Scotland.	The whole act.
17 & 18 Vict. c. 75	Acknowledgement of Deeds by Married Women Act 1854	An Act to remove Doubts concerning the due Acknowledgment of Deeds by Married Women in certain Cases.	Section Two.
17 & 18 Vict. c. 76 (Note: The text of the act does not start "in part".)	Convict Prisons (Ireland) Act 1854	An Act for the Formation, Regulation, and Government of Convict Prisons in Ireland.	Section One.
17 & 18 Vict. c. 80	Registration of Births, Deaths, and Marriages (Scotland) Act 1854	An Act to provide for the better Registration of Births, Deaths, and Marriages in Scotland.	Section One from "Provided" to "had not been passed". Section Fifty-nine from "according" to "Westmorland". Section Sixty-five, the words "and such Penalty shall go to the Registrar General".
17 & 18 Vict. c. 81	Oxford University Act 1854	An Act to make further Provision for the good Government and Extension of the University of Oxford, of the Colleges therein, and of the College of Saint Mary, Winchester.	Sections One to Four and Seven. Section Fourteen from "and if the Vice-Chancellor" to "as they may think fit". Section Twenty-five from "but no such Licence" to the end of that Section. Sections Twenty-Seven to Thirty-eight, Forty-two, Forty-four, and Forty-Six.
17 & 18 Vict. c. 89	Spirits (Ireland) Act 1854	An Act to amend the Laws for the better Prevention of the Sale of Spirits by unlicensed Persons, and for the Suppression of Illicit Distillation, in Ireland.	Section One. Section Nine to "this Act". Section Eleven to "this Act". Section Twelve, the words "from and after the Commencement of this Act".
17 & 18 Vict. c. 90	Usury Laws Repeal Act 1854	An Act to repeal the Laws relating to Usury and to the Enrolment of Annuities.	Section One to "hereto,". Section Two. The Schedule.
17 & 18 Vict. c. 91	Lands Valuation (Scotland) Act 1854	An Act for the Valuation of Lands and Heritages in Scotland.	Section One from "and within" to the end of that Section. Section Four from "the first" to "fifty-five; and" and the word "subsequent". Section Twenty-one from "on or before" to "fifty-five, and" and the word "subsequent". Section Thirty-five from "as nearly" to "form and". The Schedule.
17 & 18 Vict. c. 92	Crime and Outrage (Ireland) Act 1854	An Act to continue an Act of the Eleventh Year of Her present Majesty, for the better Prevention of Crime and Outrage in certain Parts of Ireland.	The whole act.
17 & 18 Vict. c. 94	Public Revenue and Consolidated Fund Charges Act 1854	An Act to alter the Mode of providing for certain Expenses now charged upon certain Branches of the Public Revenue and upon the Consolidated Fund.	Section One from "Provided also" to the end of that Section.
17 & 18 Vict. c. 95	Public Health Act 1854	An Act to make better Provision for the Administration of the Laws relating to the Public Health.	The whole act.
17 & 18 Vict. c. 98	Parochial Schoolmaster (Scotland) Act 1854	An Act to regulate the Salaries of the Parochial Schoolmasters of Scotland.	The whole act.
17 & 18 Vict. c. 100	Court of Chancery Act 1854	An Act to make further Provision for the more speedy and efficient Despatch of Business in the High Court of Chancery.	The whole act.
17 & 18 Vict. c. 105	Militia Law Amendment Act 1854	An Act to amend the Laws relating to the Militia in England and Wales.	Section One. Section Thirty-one from "and Officers" to the end of that Section, and so much of the rest of the Section as relates to property qualifications of officers of the militia. Sections Thirty-two, Thirty-five, Thirty-six, and Thirty-eight. Section Forty-eight to "repealed; and".
17 & 18 Vict. c. 106	Militia (Scotland) Act 1854	An Act for amending the Laws relating to the Militia, and raising a Volunteer Force, in Scotland.	Section Two from "and the said Lieutenants shall" to the end of that Section. Section Three from "to grant Commissions" to "Lieutenant thereof, and". Section Four from "to grant Commissions" to "Lieutenant could do", and the word "other". Section Five. Sections Six, Seven, and Nine, so far as they relate to property qualifications. Sections Ten, Eleven, Sixteen, and Eighteen. Section Nineteen, the words "shall being thus qualified as aforesaid". Section Twenty-one from "although" to "Captains". Section Twenty-five, as to the form of oath thereby prescribed; and from "and it shall" to the end of that Section. Section Twenty-nine from "in the Year" to "fifty-five", and from "and the Deputy" to the end of that Section. Section Thirty-one from "and the Deputy" to the end of that Section.
17 & 18 Vict. c. 107	Militia (Ireland) Act 1854	An Act to amend the Laws relating to the Militia, and for raising a Volunteer Militia Force, in Ireland.	Sections Five, Six, and Seven. Section Eleven from "in the Year" to "fifty-five", and from "and the Deputy" to the end of that Section. Section Sixteen, as to the form of oath thereby prescribed; and from "inserting therein" to "joining the same". Section Thirty-one to "repealed; and".
17 & 18 Vict. c. 108	Militia Ballots Suspension Act 1854	An Act to suspend the making of Lists and the Ballots for the Militia of the United Kingdom.	The whole act.
17 & 18 Vict. c. 109	Militia Pay Act 1854	An Act the title of which begins with the words,—An Act to defray the Charge of the Pay,—and ends with the words,—and to authorize the Employment of the Non-commissioned Officers.	The whole act.
17 & 18 Vict. c. 110	Advances to County of Mayo Act 1854	An Act to provide for the Repayment of Monies advanced from the Exchequer to the County of Mayo for Public Purposes.	The whole act.
17 & 18 Vict. c. 111	Metropolitan Sewers Act 1854	An Act to continue and amend the Metropolitan Sewers Acts.	The whole act.
17 & 18 Vict. c. 114	University of London Medical Graduates Act 1854	An Act to extend the Rights enjoyed by the Graduates of the Universities of Oxford and Cambridge in respect to the Practice of Physic to the Graduates of the University of London.	Section Two.
17 & 18 Vict. c. 120	Merchant Shipping Repeal Act 1854	An Act to repeal certain Acts and Parts of Acts relating to Merchant Shipping, and to continue certain Provisions in the said Acts.	Section Four, the first proviso. Section Five. Section Seven from "and this" to the end of that Section. Section Eight from "and whereas" to the end of that Section. Section Nine. Section Ten from "and this" to the end of that Section. Section Twelve from "and this" to the end of that Section. Section Fourteen.
17 & 18 Vict. c. 121	Appropriation Act 1854	An Act to apply a Sum out of the Consolidated Fund and certain other Sums to the Service of the Year One thousand eight hundred and fifty-four, and to appropriate the Supplies granted in this Session of Parliament.	The whole act.
17 & 18 Vict. c. 123	Russian Government Securities Act 1854	An Act to deal with any Dealing in Securities issued during the present War between Russia and England by the Russian Government à la Bourse.	The whole act.
17 & 18 Vict. c. 125	Common Law Procedure Act 1854	An Act for the further Amendment of the Process, Practice, and Mode of Pleading in and enlarging the Jurisdiction of the Superior Courts of Common Law at Westminster, and of the Superior Courts of Common Law of the Counties Palatine of Lancaster and Durham.	Section One hundred and three, the words "and Twenty-eight, Twenty-nine". Section One hundred and seven, the words "save as aforesaid".
18 & 19 Vict. c. 1	Militia (No. 1) Act 1855	An Act to enable Her Majesty to accept the Services of the Militia out of the United Kingdom, for the vigorous Prosecution of the War.	Section One to Fourteen.
18 & 19 Vict. c. 2	Enlistment of Foreigners Act 1855	An Act to permit Foreigners to be enlisted and to serve as Officers and Soldiers in Her Majesty's Forces.	The whole act.
18 & 19 Vict. c. 3	Fishery Treaty with United States Act 1855	An Act to carry into effect a Treaty between Her Majesty and the United States of America.	Repealed as to all Her Majesty's Dominions.
18 & 19 Vict. c. 4	Army Enlistment Act 1855	An Act to amend the Act for limiting the Time of Service in the Army.	The whole act.
18 & 19 Vict. c. 5	Supply Act 1855	An Act to apply the Sum of Three millions three hundred thousand Pounds out of the Consolidated Fund to the Service of the Year ending on the Thirty-first Day of March One thousand eight hundred and fifty-six.	The whole act.
18 & 19 Vict. c. 6	Supply (No. 2) Act 1855	An Act to apply the Sum of Twenty Millions out of the Consolidated Fund to the Service of the Year One thousand eight hundred and fifty-five.	The whole act.
18 & 19 Vict. c. 8	Exchequer Bills Act 1855	An Act for raising the Sum of Seventeen millions one hundred and sixty-three thousand Pounds by Exchequer Bills, for the Service of the Year One thousand eight hundred and fifty-five.	The whole act.
18 & 19 Vict. c. 10	House of Commons Act 1855	An Act to enable a Third Principal Secretary and a Third Under Secretary of State to sit in the House of Commons.	The whole act.
18 & 19 Vict. c. 11	Mutiny Act 1855	An Act for punishing Mutiny and Desertion, and for the better Payment of the Army and their Quarters.	The whole act.
18 & 19 Vict. c. 12	Marine Mutiny Act 1855	An Act for the Regulation of Her Majesty's Royal Marine Forces while on shore.	The whole act.
18 & 19 Vict. c. 15	Judgments Act 1855	An Act for the better Protection of Purchasers against Judgments, Crown Debts, Cases of Lis pendens, and Life Annuities or Rentcharges.	Section Seven from "and the Proviso" to the end of that Section.
18 & 19 Vict. c. 19	Militia (Ireland) Act 1855	An Act the title of which begins with the words,—An Act to remove Doubts as to the Commissions of Officers of Militia,—and ends with the words,—to amend the Law relating to the Militia in Ireland.	Sections One to Six. Section Eight from "by the Lieutenant" to "Governors of Ireland".
18 & 19 Vict. c. 20	Income Tax Act 1855	An Act for granting to Her Majesty an increased Rate of Duty on Profits arising from Property, Professions, Trades, and Offices.	The whole act.
18 & 19 Vict. c. 22	Excise Duties Act 1855	An Act for granting certain additional Rates and Duties of Excise.	The whole act.
18 & 19 Vict. c. 26	Forms of Pleading in High Court Act 1855	An Act to continue an Act of the Thirteenth and Fourteenth Years of Her present Majesty, for enabling the Judges of the Courts of Common Law at Westminster to alter the Forms of Pleading.	The whole act.
18 & 19 Vict. c. 28	Ecclesiastical Property (Ireland) Act 1855	An Act to provide that the Property or Income Tax payable in respect of the Income from Ecclesiastical Property in Ireland shall be a Deduction in estimating the Value of such Property for the purpose of taxation by the Ecclesiastical Commissioners.	The whole act.
18 & 19 Vict. c. 30	Metropolitan Sewers Act 1855	An Act to empower the Commissioners of Sewers to appeal on those Drainage a certain Sum out of the Monies borrowed by them on security of the Rates, and also to give to the said Commissioners certain other Powers for the same Purpose.	The whole act.
18 & 19 Vict. c. 32	Stannaries Act 1855	An Act to amend and extend the Jurisdiction of the Stannary Court.	Section Eighteen from "and so much" to the end of that Section. Section Twenty-six to "henceforth". Sections Twenty-eight and Thirty.
18 & 19 Vict. c. 33	Validity of Proceedings in the House of Commons Act 1855	An Act to prevent Doubts as to the Validity of certain Proceedings in the House of Commons.	The whole act.
18 & 19 Vict. c. 35	Income Tax (Insurance) Act 1855	An Act to continue the Act for extending for a limited Time the Provision for Abatement of Income Tax in respect of Insurance on Lives.	Section Two.
18 & 19 Vict. c. 36	Oxford University Act 1855	An Act to repeal the Stamp Duties payable on Matriculation and Degrees in the University of Oxford.	Section One.
18 & 19 Vict. c. 37	Supply (No. 3) Act 1855	An Act to apply the Sum of Ten Millions out of the Consolidated Fund to the Service of the Year One thousand eight hundred and fifty-five.	The whole act.
18 & 19 Vict. c. 41	Ecclesiastical Courts Act 1855	An Act for abolishing the Jurisdiction of the Ecclesiastical Courts of England and Wales in Suits for Defamation.	Section Two.
18 & 19 Vict. c. 47	Poor Law Union Charges Act 1855	An Act to continue an Act of the Eighteenth Year of Her present Majesty, for charging the Maintenance of certain poor Persons in Unions in England and Wales upon the Common Fund.	The whole act.
18 & 19 Vict. c. 48	Cinque Ports Act 1855	An Act for the better Administration of Justice in the County Ports.	Section One from "Provided always" to the end of that Section.
18 & 19 Vict. c. 51	Poor Rates Act 1855	An Act to continue the Exemption of Inhabitants from Liability to be rated as such in respect of Stock in Trade or other Property to the Relief of the Poor.	The whole act.
18 & 19 Vict. c. 52	Copyhold, etc., Commission Act 1855	An Act to continue Appointments under the Act for consolidating the Copyhold and Inclosure Commissions, and for completing Proceedings under the Tithe Commutation Acts.	The whole act.
18 & 19 Vict. c. 59	Endowed Schools Inquiries (Ireland) Act 1855	An Act to facilitate Inquiries of Commissioners of Endowed Schools in Ireland.	The whole act.
18 & 19 Vict. c. 60	Wedding Rings Act 1855	An Act for excepting Gold Wedding Rings from the Operation of the Act of the last Session relating to the Standard of Gold and Silver Wares, and regulating the Exemptions contained in other Acts relating to Gold Wares.	Sections Two and Three.
18 & 19 Vict. c. 71	West India Loans Act 1855	An Act to authorize the Commissioners of the Treasury to make Arrangements concerning certain Loans advanced by way of Relief to the Islands of Antigua, Nevis, and Montserrat.	Repealed as to all Her Majesty's Dominions.
18 & 19 Vict. c. 72	Weights and Measures Act 1855	An Act for legalizing and preserving the restored Standards of Weights and Measures.	Sections One and Five.
18 & 19 Vict. c. 73	Incumbered Estates (Ireland) Act 1855	An Act to extend the Period for applying for a Sale under the Acts for facilitating the Sale and Transfer of Incumbered Estates in Ireland.	The whole act.
18 & 19 Vict. c. 75	Ecclesiastical Jurisdiction Act 1855	An Act to continue certain temporary Provisions concerning Ecclesiastical Jurisdiction in England.	The whole act.
18 & 19 Vict. c. 76	Private Lunatic Asylums (Ireland) Act 1855	An Act to continue an Act of the Fifth and Sixth Years of Her present Majesty for amending the Law relative to Private Lunatic Asylums in Ireland.	The whole act.
18 & 19 Vict. c. 77	Convention with United States Act 1855	An Act to give Effect to a Convention between Her Majesty and the United States of America.	The whole act.
18 & 19 Vict. c. 82	Trinity College, Dublin Act 1855	An Act to abolish certain Payments, and to confer Degrees in the University of Dublin.	The whole act.
18 & 19 Vict. c. 83	Turnpike Acts (Ireland) Act 1855	An Act to continue certain Acts for regulating Turnpike Roads in Ireland.	The whole act.
18 & 19 Vict. c. 94	Excise Act 1855	An Act to impose increased Rates of Duty of Excise, and to amend the Laws relating to the Customs.	Sections One to Four, Nine, Ten, Twenty-eight, and Thirty. Section Thirty-one, so far as it relates to Distillers. Section Thirty-two from "or if any Person" to "thereto belonging". Sections Thirty-three and Thirty-four.
18 & 19 Vict. c. 96	Supplemental Customs Consolidation Act 1855	An Act for the Management and Collection (otherwise than by the Commissioners for the Receipt of Her Majesty's Exchequer at Westminster.	Sections Seventeen and Forty-four. Section Forty-five and the Table therein referred to, so far as they respectively relate to Sections One, Ten, Twelve, Seventeen, Nineteen and Twenty-three. Schedule of Acts to be repealed. Repealed as to all Her Majesty's Dominions.
18 & 19 Vict. c. 97	Customs Tariff Act 1855	An Act for the Amendment and Consolidation of the Customs Tariff Acts.	Sections Nine and Ten. Repealed as to all Her Majesty's Dominions.
18 & 19 Vict. c. 98	Annual Turnpike Acts Continuance Act 1855	An Act concerning certain Turnpike Acts in Great Britain.	The whole act.
18 & 19 Vict. c. 100	Officers of the Militia Act 1855	An Act to amend the Law concerning the Qualification of Officers of the Militia. (Note: This act was already repealed by the Militia (Voluntary Enlistment) Act 1875 (38 & 39 Vict. c. 69), but the note to the bill makes no reference to that act.)	The whole act.
18 & 19 Vict. c. 103	Spirits (Ireland) Act 1855	An Act to amend an Act of the last Session of Parliament.	Section One from "and all such Goods seized" to the end of the Section.
18 & 19 Vict. c. 105	Lunacy Regulation Act 1855	An Act to amend the Lunatic Asylums Act, 1853, and the Acts passed in the Ninth and Seventeenth Years of Her Majesty, for the Regulation of the Care and Treatment of Lunatics.	Section Fifteen from "and all such Orders" to the end of that Section.
18 & 19 Vict. c. 106	Militia Ballot System Act 1855	An Act to suspend the making of Lists and the Ballots for the Militia of the United Kingdom.	The whole act.
18 & 19 Vict. c. 107	Island of Tobago Loan Act 1855	An Act to authorize the Commissioners of the Treasury to make Arrangements concerning a certain Loan advanced by way of Relief to the Island of Tobago.	Repealed as to all Her Majesty's Dominions.
18 & 19 Vict. c. 110	Drainage and Improvement of Lands (Ireland) Act 1855	An Act to authorise the Application of certain Sums, Drainage of Land and Improvements in connexion therewith in Ireland.	Section One to Eight.
18 & 19 Vict. c. 112	Crimes and Outrage (Ireland) Act 1855	An Act to continue an Act of the Eleventh Year of Her present Majesty, for the better Prevention of Crime and Outrage in certain Parts of Ireland.	The whole act.
18 & 19 Vict. c. 115	General Board of Health Continuance Act 1855	An Act to continue and amend the Public Health Act (1854).	Section One. Section Three so far as it relates to the salary of the medical officer. And so much of the rest of the Act as relates to the appointment and payment of a medical officer.
18 & 19 Vict. c. 119	Passengers Act 1855	An Act to amend the Law relating to the Carriage of Passengers by Sea.	Section One. Section Four from "nor to any Ship of War or Transport " to the end of that Section. Section Five. Section Thirty- seven, the words " acting under the Authority of one of Her Majesty's Principal Secretaries of State " and the words " acting under such Authority and ". Section Sixty-eight. Schedule (A.) Repealed as to all Her Majesty's Dominions.
18 & 19 Vict. c. 120	Metropolis Management Act 1855	An Act for the better Local Management of the Metropolis.	Sections One and Four. Section Seven from "and between the Fifth" to "Auditors". Section Nine from "and the Vestry" to "respectively". Section Twenty-four from "Provided" to the end of that Section. Section Thirty-four from "and the Vestry" to "respectively". Section Thirty-nine from "subject nevertheless" to the end of that Section. Section Forty-eight from "and such First" to "respectively". Section Fifty-two to "Meetings; and". Sections Ninety-five and Ninety-seven. Section One hundred and forty-five from "and in the mean time" to the end of that Section. Section Two hundred and twenty-four. Section Two hundred and thirty-six from "and the Sums paid" to the end of that Section.
18 & 19 Vict. c. 122	Metropolitan Building Act 1855	An Act to amend the Laws relating to the Construction of Buildings in the Metropolis and its Neighbourhood.	Section One hundred and nine. Section One hundred and ten to "County Court; and".
18 & 19 Vict. c. 123	Militia Pay Act 1855	An Act to defray the Charge of the Pay of Non-commissioned Officers.	The whole act.
18 & 19 Vict. c. 124	Charitable Trusts Amendment Act 1855	An Act to amend the Charitable Trusts Act, 1853.	Sections Two and Nineteen. Section Thirty to "repealed; but". Section Twenty-four to "passing of this Act; and". Section Forty-seven to "Persons of that Persuasion". And so much of the rest of the Act as relates to district courts of bankruptcy.
18 & 19 Vict. c. 127	Union of Benefices, etc. Act 1855	An Act to make better Provision for the Union of contiguous Benefices, and to facilitate the building and endowing of new Churches in spiritually destitute Districts.	The whole act.
18 & 19 Vict. c. 128	Burial Act 1855	An Act further to amend the Laws concerning the Burial of the Dead in England.	Section Five.
18 & 19 Vict. c. 129	Appropriation Act 1855	An Act to apply a Sum out of the Consolidated Fund and the Surplus of Ways and Means to the Service of the Year One thousand eight hundred and fifty-five, and to appropriate the Supplies granted in this Session of Parliament.	The whole act.
18 & 19 Vict. c. 130	Exchequer Bills and Bonds Act 1855	An Act for raising the Sum of Seven Millions by Exchequer Bills and Exchequer Bonds, for the Service of the Year One thousand eight hundred and fifty-five.	The whole act.
18 & 19 Vict. c. 132	Labourers Dwellings Act 1855	An Act for facilitating the Erection of Dwelling Houses for the Labouring Classes.	The whole act.
18 & 19 Vict. c. 133	Limited Liability Act 1855	An Act for limiting the Liability of Members of certain Joint Stock Companies.	The whole act.
18 & 19 Vict. c. 134	Court of Chancery Act 1855	An Act to make further Provision for the more speedy and efficient Despatch of Business in the High Court of Chancery, and to vest in the Lord Chancellor the Ground and Buildings of the said Court situate in Southampton Buildings, Chancery Lane, with Powers of leasing and Sale thereof.	Sections Three, Four, Seven, Nine, and Ten. Section Eleven, except as to Seth Charles Ward, the present sixth Clerk of Records and Writs. Section Twelve from "but so" to the end of that Section. Section Thirteen.
19 & 20 Vict. c. 1	House of Commons Offices Act 1856	An Act to continue certain Offices of the House of Commons.	Section One to "confirmed; and". Section Two.
19 & 20 Vict. c. 2	Metropolitan Police Act 1856	An Act to amend the Acts relating to the Metropolitan Police.	Section One from "and the Person" to "Metropolis". Section Ten.
19 & 20 Vict. c. 4	Supply Act 1856	An Act to apply the Sum of One million six hundred and thirty-six thousand and five Pounds One Shilling and Fivepence out of the Consolidated Fund to the Service of the Year ending the Thirty-first Day of March One thousand eight hundred and fifty-six.	The whole act.
19 & 20 Vict. c. 7	Supply (No. 2) Act 1856	An Act to apply the Sum of Twenty-six millions out of the Consolidated Fund to the Service of the Year One thousand eight hundred and fifty-six.	The whole act.
19 & 20 Vict. c. 8	Marine Mutiny Act 1856	An Act for the Regulation of Her Majesty's Royal Marine Forces while on shore.	The whole act.
19 & 20 Vict. c. 10	Mutiny Act 1856	An Act for punishing Mutiny and Desertion, and for the better Payment of the Army and their Quarters.	The whole act.
19 & 20 Vict. c. 14	Poor Law Commissioners (Ireland) Act 1856	An Act to abolish the Office of Secretary to the Poor Law Commissioners in Ireland.	The whole act.
19 & 20 Vict. c. 15	Out-pensioners of Greenwich and Chelsea Hospitals Act 1856	An Act for further regulating the Payment of the Out-Pensioners of Greenwich and Chelsea Hospitals.	Section One.
19 & 20 Vict. c. 18	Public Works (Ireland) Act 1856	An Act to authorize for a further Period the Application of Money for the Purposes of Loans for carrying on Public Works in Ireland.	Sections One to Six, Nine and Ten.
19 & 20 Vict. c. 19	Exchequer Bills Act 1856	An Act for raising the Sum of Twenty-one million one hundred and eighty-two thousand Pounds by Exchequer Bills for the Service of the Year One thousand eight hundred and fifty-six.	The whole act.
19 & 20 Vict. c. 20	Bankers' Compositions Act 1856	An Act to continue certain Compositions payable to Bankers who have ceased to issue Bank Notes.	Section One.
19 & 20 Vict. c. 31	Oxford University Act 1856	An Act to amend the Act of the Seventeenth and Eighteenth Years of Her Majesty, concerning the University of Oxford and the College of Saint Mary Winchester.	The whole act.
19 & 20 Vict. c. 33	Income Tax Act 1856	An Act to continue the Act for extending for a limited Time the Period for Abatement of Income Tax in respect of Insurance on Life.	The whole act.
19 & 20 Vict. c. 34	Excise Duties Act 1856	An Act to grant Allowances of Excise Duty on Malt in Stock.	Sections One to Fifteen, Seventeen, and Eighteen.
19 & 20 Vict. c. 42	Poor Rates Act 1856	An Act to continue the Act for the Exemption of Stock in Trade from Rating.	The whole act.
19 & 20 Vict. c. 44	Exchequer Bills and Bonds Act 1856	An Act for raising the Sum of Four Millions by Exchequer Bills and Exchequer Bonds, for the Service of the Year One thousand eight hundred and fifty-six.	The whole act.
19 & 20 Vict. c. 49	Annual Turnpike Acts Continuance Act 1856	An Act to continue certain Turnpike Acts in Great Britain.	The whole act.
19 & 20 Vict. c. 51	Use of Rice in Distillation Act 1856	An Act to permit the Use of Rice in the Distillation of Spirits.	The whole act.
19 & 20 Vict. c. 52	Militia Ballots Suspension Act 1856	An Act to suspend the making of Lists and the Ballots for the Militia of the United Kingdom.	The whole act.
19 & 20 Vict. c. 56	Exchequer Court (Scotland) Act 1856	An Act to constitute the Court of Session the Court of Exchequer in Scotland, and to regulate the Procedure therein Matters transferred from the Exchequer.	Sections Eighteen, Twenty-six, Forty-eight, and Forty-nine.
19 & 20 Vict. c. 58	Burgh Voters Registration (Scotland) Act 1856	An Act to amend the Law for the Registration of Persons entitled to vote in the Election of Members to serve in Parliament for Burghs in Scotland.	Section One to "made; and". Section Twenty-four from "of which" to "Member". Section Twenty-five, the words "whether of Registration or Appeal" and the words "or sitting as a Member thereof". Section Twenty-six, the words "by the first-recited Act". Section Twenty-seven. Section Twenty-eight, the words "under this and the first-recited Act". Section Thirty from "provided also" to "fifty-six". Section Thirty-two from "and so much" to "regulated". Sections Thirty-three and Forty-seven.
19 & 20 Vict. c. 59	Revenue (Transfer of Charges) Act 1856	An Act to alter the Mode of providing for certain Expenses now charged upon certain Parts of the Public Revenue.	Schedule (A.) so far as it relates to the annuity formerly payable to the Duke of Grafton.
19 & 20 Vict. c. 62	Drainage (Ireland) Act 1856	An Act to provide for the Maintenance of Navigations made in connection with Drainage, and to make further Provision in relation to Works of Drainage in Ireland.	Section Twenty-six.
19 & 20 Vict. c. 63	Grand Jury (Ireland) Act 1856	An Act to amend the Acts relating to Grand Juries in Ireland.	Section Twenty.
19 & 20 Vict. c. 64	Repeal of Obsolete Statutes Act 1856	An Act to repeal certain Statutes which are not in use.	The whole act.
19 & 20 Vict. c. 67	Incumbered Estates (Ireland) Act 1856	An Act to extend the Period for applying for a Sale under the Acts for facilitating the Sale and Transfer of Incumbered Estates in Ireland, and to amend the said Acts.	The whole act.
19 & 20 Vict. c. 68	Prisons (Ireland) Act 1856	An Act to further amend the Laws relating to Prison in Ireland.	Section Three, the words "and the Commissioners of the Court for relief of Insolvent Debtors in Ireland," and the rest of that Section so far as it relates to the Four Courts Marshalsea. Section Seventeen. Section Twenty from "and every Person" to "given and directed". Section Thirty-one.
19 & 20 Vict. c. 69	County and Borough Police Act 1856	An Act to render more effectual the Police in Counties and Boroughs in England and Wales.	Sections Twenty-one, Twenty-five, and Twenty-six. Section Twenty-seven to "Her Majesty; and".
19 & 20 Vict. c. 71	Annual Turnpike Acts (Ireland) Continuance Act 1856	An Act to continue certain Acts for Regulating Turnpike Roads in Ireland.	The whole act.
19 & 20 Vict. c. 72	Railways (Ireland) Act 1856	An Act to continue the Railways Act, 1854.	The whole act.
19 & 20 Vict. c. 74	Episcopal, etc., Estates Management Act 1856	An Act to continue the Act to facilitate the Management and Improvement of Episcopal and Capitular Estates in England.	The whole act.
19 & 20 Vict. c. 75	Customs Act 1856	An Act for the further Alteration and Amendment of the Laws and Duties of Customs.	Sections One, Two, and Ten. Repealed as to all Her Majesty's Dominions.
19 & 20 Vict. c. 76	Roman Catholic Charities Act 1856	An Act to continue for a limited Time the Exemption of certain Charities from the Operation of the Charitable Trusts Acts.	The whole act.
19 & 20 Vict. c. 77	Chancery Receivers (Ireland) Act 1856	An Act to amend the Law and Practice of the Court of Chancery in Ireland in relation to the Appointment of Receivers over Real Estate, and to expedite the Sale of Estates in the said Court.	Section Five.
19 & 20 Vict. c. 78	Unlawful Oaths (Ireland) Act 1856	An Act to continue the Act of the Second and Third Years of Her Majesty, Chapter Seventy-four, for preventing the administering and taking unlawful Oaths in Ireland, as amended by an Act of the Eleventh and Twelfth Years of Her Majesty's Reign.	The whole act.
19 & 20 Vict. c. 79	Bankruptcy (Scotland) Act 1856	An Act to consolidate and amend the Laws relating to Bankruptcy in Scotland.	Section Two. Section Three from "or Proceedings" to "herein-after provided" and from "Provided always" to the end of that Section. Section One hundred and forty from "and the Clerk" to "registries" in the Form of Schedule (1.). Schedule (1.) III.—Sheriff Court. from "(2) To the Sheriff" to "1 1 0".
19 & 20 Vict. c. 80	Taxes Act 1856	An Act to grant Relief from the Income Tax.	Section Three.
19 & 20 Vict. c. 83	Coast-guard Service Act 1856	An Act to provide for the better Defence of the Coasts of the Realm, and the more ready Manning of the Navy, and to transfer to the Admiralty the Government of the Coast Guard.	Section Eight from "and all Petty Officers" to the end of that Section. Section Nine. Repealed as to all Her Majesty's Dominions.
19 & 20 Vict. c. 84	Corrupt Practices Act 1856	An Act to continue the Corrupt Practices Prevention Act, 1854.	The whole act.
19 & 20 Vict. c. 85	General Board of Health Act 1856	An Act to continue the General Board of Health.	The whole act.
19 & 20 Vict. c. 87	Lunatic Asylums Act 1856	From "or where" to "this Act".	
19 & 20 Vict. c. 88	Cambridge University Act 1856	An Act to make further Provision for the good Government and Extension of the University of Cambridge, of the Colleges therein, and of the College of King Henry the Sixth at Eton.	Sections One to Four, Nine, Sixteen, and Eighteen. Section Twenty-three from "but no" to the end of that Section. Section Twenty-nine to "University; and". Section Thirty-six to "Provided always that". Section Thirty-seven to Forty-four. Section Forty-five from "or upon teaching" to "or Music". Sections Forty-seven, Fifty-two, and Fifty-three.
19 & 20 Vict. c. 90	Militia Pay Act 1856	An Act to defray the Charge of the Pay of the Non-commissioned Officers.	The whole act.
19 & 20 Vict. c. 92	Chancery Appeal Court (Ireland) Act 1856	An Act to constitute a Court of Appeal in Chancery, and to amend the Law relating to Appeals from the Incumbered Estates Court in Ireland.	Section Six. Section Seven from "to Appeals" to "fifty-seven, or". Sections Ten, Twenty-one, Twenty-seven, and Twenty-eight.
19 & 20 Vict. c. 98	Burial Grounds (Ireland) Act 1856	An Act to amend the Laws relating to the Burial of the Dead in Ireland.	Section Eighteen from "and with respect" to "by Agreement".
19 & 20 Vict. c. 101	Contagious Diseases, Animals Act 1856	An Act to continue certain Acts to prevent the spreading of contagious or infectious Disorders among Sheep, Cattle, and other Animals.	The whole act.
19 & 20 Vict. c. 102	Common Law Procedure Amendment Act (Ireland) 1856	An Act to further amend the Procedure in and to enlarge the Jurisdiction of the Superior Courts of Common Law in Ireland.	Section Three. Section Ninety-six to "repealed; and". Section Ninety-eight, the figures "34, 35".
19 & 20 Vict. c. 105	Appropriation Act 1856	An Act to apply a Sum out of the Consolidated Fund and the Surplus of Ways and Means to the Service of the Year One thousand eight hundred and fifty-six, and to appropriate the Supplies granted in this Session of Parliament.	The whole act.
19 & 20 Vict. c. 108	County Courts Act 1856	An Act to amend the Acts relating to the County Courts.	Sections One and Two. Section Eleven from "and the Provisions" to the end of that Section. Section Twenty-three to "Conversation; but" and the word "other". Sections Thirty-seven, Fifty-nine, Sixty-one, and Seventy-seven. Schedule A. Schedule B, Forms Nos. 2 and 3. Schedule D. except so far as it relates to— F. Bayley, Esq., J. Pride Taylor, Esq., W. Furner, Esq., T. Falconer, Esq., J. St. John Yates, Esq.
19 & 20 Vict. c. 112	Metropolis Management Amendment Act 1856	An Act to amend the Act of the last Session of Parliament, One hundred and twenty, for the better Local Management of the Metropolis.	Section One from "Provided" to the end of that Section.
19 & 20 Vict. c. 114	Hay and Straw Act 1856	An Act to prevent false Packing and other Frauds in the Hay and Straw Trade.	Section Five from "Provided always" to the end of that Section.
19 & 20 Vict. c. 115	Bishops of London and Durham Act 1856	An Act to provide for the Retirement of the present Bishops of London and Durham.	The whole act.
20 Vict. c. 2	County Police Act 1857	An Act to facilitate the Appointment of Chief Constables for adjoining Counties, and to confirm Appointments of Chief Constables in certain Cases.	Sections One and Three.
20 Vict. c. 6	Income Tax Act 1857	An Act to reduce the Rates of Duty on Profits arising from Property, Professions, Trades, and Offices.	The whole act.
20 Vict. c. 8	Copyhold, etc., Commission Act 1857	An Act to continue Appointments under the Act for consolidating the Copyhold and Inclosure Commissions, and for completing Proceedings under the Tithe Commutation Acts.	The whole act.
20 Vict. c. 10	Ecclesiastical Jurisdiction Act 1857	An Act to continue temporary Provisions concerning Ecclesiastical Jurisdiction in England.	The whole act.
20 Vict. c. 11	Commissioners of Supply (Scotland) Act 1857	An Act to amend the Commissioners of Supply (Scotland) Act, 1856.	Sections One and Two.
20 Vict. c. 13	Mutiny Act 1857	An Act for punishing Mutiny and Desertion, and for the better Payment of the Army and their Quarters.	The whole act.
20 Vict. c. 14	Marine Mutiny Act 1857	An Act for the Regulation of Her Majesty's Royal Marine Forces while on shore.	The whole act.
20 Vict. c. 15	Customs Duties Amendment Act 1857	An Act for granting certain Duties of Customs on Tea, Sugar, and other Articles.	The whole act.
20 Vict. c. 17	Exchequer Bills Act 1857	An Act for raising the Sum of Twenty-one million forty-nine thousand seven hundred Pounds by Exchequer Bills, for the Service of the Year One thousand eight hundred and fifty-seven.	The whole act.
20 Vict. c. 18	Poor Act 1857	An Act to continue the Act for charging the Maintenance of certain Paupers upon the Union Funds.	The whole act.
20 Vict. c. 20	Appropriation Act 1857	An Act to apply a Sum out of the Consolidated Fund to the Service of the Year One thousand eight hundred and fifty-seven, and to appropriate the Supplies granted in this Session of Parliament.	The whole act.
20 & 21 Vict. c. 3	Penal Servitude Act 1857	An Act to amend the Act of the Sixteenth and Seventeenth Years of Her Majesty, to substitute, in certain Cases, other Punishment in lieu of Transportation.	Section One.
20 & 21 Vict. c. 4	Supply Act 1857	An Act to apply the Sum of Eight Millions out of the Consolidated Fund to the Service of the Year One thousand eight hundred and fifty-seven.	The whole act.
20 & 21 Vict. c. 5	Income Tax Act 1857	An Act to continue the Act for extending for a limited Time the Period for Abatement of Income Tax in respect of Insurance on Life.	The whole act.
20 & 21 Vict. c. 12	Sound Dues Redemption Act 1857	An Act to carry into effect a Convention between Her Majesty and the King of Denmark.	The whole act.
20 & 21 Vict. c. 16	Turnpikes Abolition Act (Ireland) 1857	An Act to discontinue the Toll on the Turnpike Roads now existing in Ireland, and to provide for the Maintenance of such Roads as public Roads, and for the Discharge of the Debts due thereon, and for other Purposes relating thereto.	The whole act.
20 & 21 Vict. c. 18	Bill Chamber Procedure Act 1857	An Act to regulate Procedure in the Bill Chamber in Scotland.	Section One to "abolished; and" and from "and the remaining" to the end of that Section. Section Seven from "within" to "Act". Sections Eight and Nine.
20 & 21 Vict. c. 19	Bankruptcy and Real Securities (Scotland) Act 1857	An Act to remove Doubts as to the Law of Bankruptcy and Real Securities in Scotland.	Section Eight.
20 & 21 Vict. c. 21	Militia Ballots Suspension Act 1857	An Act to suspend the making of Lists and the Ballots for the Militia of the United Kingdom.	The whole act.
20 & 21 Vict. c. 24	Annual Turnpike Acts Continuance Act 1857	An Act to continue certain Turnpike Acts in Great Britain.	The whole act.
20 & 21 Vict. c. 25	Oxford University Act 1857	An Act to continue the Powers of the Commissioners under an Act of the Seventeenth and Eighteenth Years of Her Majesty concerning the University of Oxford and the College of St. Mary Winchester, and further to amend the said Act.	Sections One and Two.
20 & 21 Vict. c. 28	Land and Assessed Taxes (Scotland) Act 1857	An Act to amend the Laws relating to the Payment of the Land and Assessed Taxes and Property and Income Tax in Scotland.	Section One. Section Two from "assessed" to "fifty-eight", the words "for the same Year", from "assessed" to "Land Tax", and the word "subsequent".
20 & 21 Vict. c. 35	City of London Burial Act 1857	An Act to amend an Act passed in the Fifteenth and Sixteenth Years of the Reign of Her present Majesty Queen Victoria, intituled An Act to amend the Laws concerning the Burial of the Dead in the Metropolis, so far as relates to the City of London and the Liberties thereof.	Section Nine.
20 & 21 Vict. c. 37	Civil Service Superannuation Act 1857	An Act to repeal the Twenty-seventh Section of the Superannuation Act, 1834.	The whole act.
20 & 21 Vict. c. 38	General Board of Health Act 1857	An Act to continue the General Board of Health.	The whole act.
20 & 21 Vict. c. 40	Illicit Distillation (Ireland) Act 1857	An Act to continue and amend an Act for continuing the Appointment of Officers of Customs for certain Purposes.	Section One.
20 & 21 Vict. c. 41	Loan Societies Act 1857	An Act to revive and continue an Act to amend the Laws relating to Loan Societies.	The whole act.
20 & 21 Vict. c. 42	Burial Grounds (Scotland) Act 1857	An Act to amend "The Burial Grounds (Scotland) Act, 1855".	Section One.
20 & 21 Vict. c. 44	Crown Suits (Scotland) Act 1857	An Act to regulate the Institution of Suits at the Instance of the Crown and Public Departments in the Courts of Scotland.	Section Six.
20 & 21 Vict. c. 45	Boundary Survey (Ireland) Act 1857	An Act to make further Provision for defining the Boundaries of certain Denominations of Land in Ireland for public Purposes.	Section Four.
20 & 21 Vict. c. 56	Court of Session Act 1857	An Act to regulate the Distribution of Business in the Court of Session in Scotland.	Section Nine.
20 & 21 Vict. c. 60	Irish Bankrupt and Insolvent Act 1857	An Act to consolidate and amend the Laws relating to Bankruptcy and Insolvency in Ireland.	Sections One, Two, Seven, Thirteen, and Sixteen to Eighteen. Section Twenty-three from "and shall be paid" to the end of that Section. Section Thirty from "on any Petition" to "or any Order". Section Forty-one to "shall arise". Section Forty-two from "the present" to the end of that Section. Sections Forty-three to Forty-five. Section Forty-six from "such Salaries, however" to the end of that Section. Sections Forty-seven and Fifty-five to Fifty-seven. Section Eighty-one from "and provided also" to the end of that Section. Sections Eighty-two, Eighty-five, Two hundred and ninety-four, and Three hundred and Eighty-three. Schedule (A.). Form No. 1. in Schedule (C.). Schedules (D.) to (Y.).
20 & 21 Vict. c. 61	Customs and Excise Duties Act 1857	An Act for granting certain Duties of Customs and Excise.	The whole act.
20 & 21 Vict. c. 62	Customs Amendment Act 1857	An Act for the Alteration and Amendment of the Laws and Duties of Customs.	Sections One to Five, Seven, Eight, Eleven, Seventeen, and Twenty-two. Repealed as to all Her Majesty's Dominions.
20 & 21 Vict. c. 65	Militia Pay Act 1857	An Act to defray the Charge of the Pay of the Non-commissioned Officers.	The whole act.
20 & 21 Vict. c. 68	Dublin Revising Barristers Act 1857	An Act to enable the Lord Lieutenant to appoint Revising Barristers for the Revision of Lists and Registry of Voters for the City of Dublin.	Section Two from "and each" to the end of that Section. Section Six.
20 & 21 Vict. c. 69	Appropriation Act 1857	An Act to apply a Sum out of the Consolidated Fund and the Surplus of Ways and Means to the Service of the Year One thousand eight hundred and fifty-seven, and to appropriate the Supplies granted in this Session of Parliament.	The whole act.
20 & 21 Vict. c. 71	Lunacy (Scotland) Act 1857	An Act for the Regulation of the Care and Treatment of Lunatics, and for the Provision, Maintenance, and Regulation of Lunatic Asylums in Scotland.	Sections One and Two. Section Twenty-one from "Provided always" to the end of that Section. Section One hundred and thirteen.
20 & 21 Vict. c. 72	Police (Scotland) Act 1857	An Act to render more effectual the Police in Counties and Burghs in Scotland.	Section Nine. Section Twenty-nine from "Provided also" to the end of that Section. Section Thirty-four. Section Fifty-four from "and all Sums" to "had not been made".
20 & 21 Vict. c. 73	Smoke Nuisance (Scotland) Act 1857	An Act for the Abatement of the Nuisance arising from the Smoke of Furnaces in Scotland.	Section Three from "and in either case" to the end of that Section. Section Eight.
20 & 21 Vict. c. 74	Episcopal and Capitular Estates Act 1857	An Act to continue an Act concerning the Management of Episcopal and Capitular Estates in England.	The whole act.
20 & 21 Vict. c. 76	Roman Catholic Charities Act 1857	An Act further to continue for a limited Time the Exemption of certain Charities from the Operation of the Charitable Trusts Act.	The whole act.
20 & 21 Vict. c. 77	Court of Probate Act 1857	An Act to amend the Law relating to Probates and Letters of Administration in England.	Section One from "provided that" to the end of that Section. Sections Ten and Eleven. Section Twelve from "not exceeding" to "Court of Admiralty" and the words "or Offices", "Two thousand Pounds, or", "as the case may be", and "except the present Judge of the Prerogative Court". Section Fourteen from "Provided" to the end of that Section. Sections Fifteen to Seventeen. Section Eighteen, the words "except as herein provided", and from "in the said District" to "except as aforesaid,". Also so much of Section Eighteen and Schedule A as relates to the salaries of the registrars and officers, except as to Edward Francis Jenner, so long as he shall continue to hold the office of second registrar. Section Forty-two "County Court Registrars". Sections Forty-two to Forty-four. Section Sixty from "and for establishing" to the end of that Section. Section Eighty and Eighty-four to Eighty-six. Section Ninety-five, the words "District Registrars" (where they secondly occur). Section Ninety-seven from "the Fees of the District" to "own use". Sections Ninety-nine to One hundred and nine. Section One hundred and eleven to "Provided, that", and from "all fees" to "United Kingdom, and". Section One hundred and fourteen. Section One hundred and sixteen from "in addition" to the end of that Section.
20 & 21 Vict. c. 79	Probates and Letters of Administration Act (Ireland) 1857	An Act to amend the Law relating to Probates and Letters of Administration in Ireland.	Section One from "provided that" to the end of that Section. Section Seven from "provided that the" to "Probate; and". Sections Nine and Thirteen. Section Fifteen, the words "except the present Judge of the Prerogative Court". Sections Nineteen to Twenty-one. Section Twenty-three, the words "except as herein-before provided". Sections Forty-seven, Forty-eight, Seventy, Eighty-five, Eighty-nine to Ninety-one and One hundred and twenty.
20 & 21 Vict. c. 82	Militia Embodiment Act 1857	An Act to authorize the Embodying of the Militia.	The whole act.
20 & 21 Vict. c. 85	Matrimonial Causes Act 1857	An Act to amend the Law relating to Divorce and Matrimonial Causes in England.	Section One from "provided" to the end of that Section. Section Four and Five. Section Nine from "and shall have" to the end of that Section. Section Ten. Section Seventeen from "or to any" to "such Petition", the words "on Judge"; and from "Provided always" to the end of that Section. Section Fifty-five from "provided that one" to the end of that Section. Section Sixty-three to "in respect thereof; and" and from "provided that one" to the end of that Section. Section Sixty-five from "but such Ju"ge" to the end of that Section.
21 & 22 Vict. c. 3	East India Loans Act 1858	An Act to enable the East India Company to raise Money in the United Kingdom for the Service of the Government of India.	Section Four from "and the Principal" to the end of that Section. Section Six from "save for" to the end of that Section. Section Seven.
21 & 22 Vict. c. 4	Militia Act 1858	An Act to continue an Act of the last Session to authorize the embodying of the Militia.	The whole act.
21 & 22 Vict. c. 5	Supply Act 1858	An Act to apply the Sum of Ten Millions out of the Consolidated Fund to the Service of the Year One thousand eight hundred and fifty-eight.	The whole act.
21 & 22 Vict. c. 6	Supply (No. 2) Act 1858	An Act to apply the Sum of Five hundred thousand Pounds out of the Consolidated Fund to the Service of the Year ending the Thirty-first Day of March One thousand eight hundred and fifty-eight.	The whole act.
21 & 22 Vict. c. 7	Marine Mutiny Act 1858	An Act for the Regulation of Her Majesty's Royal Marine Forces while on shore.	The whole act.
21 & 22 Vict. c. 9	Mutiny Act 1858	An Act for punishing Mutiny and Desertion, and for the better Payment of the Army and their Quarters.	The whole act.
21 & 22 Vict. c. 11	Cambridge University Act 1858	An Act to repeal the Stamp Duties payable on Matriculation and Degrees in the University of Cambridge.	Section One.
21 & 22 Vict. c. 12	Customs Duties Act 1858	An Act for the Alteration of certain Duties of Customs.	The whole act.
21 & 22 Vict. c. 13	Exchequer Bills Act 1858	An Act for raising the Sum of Twenty million nine hundred and eleven thousand five hundred Pounds by Exchequer Bills, for the Service of the Year One thousand eight hundred and fifty-eight.	The whole act.
21 & 22 Vict. c. 14	Exchequer Bonds Act 1858	An Act for raising the Sum of Three Millions by Exchequer Bonds.	The whole act.
21 & 22 Vict. c. 15	Excise Act 1858	An Act for granting certain additional Rates and Duties of Excise.	The whole act.
21 & 22 Vict. c. 16	Customs Act 1858	An Act for the further Amendment of the Duties of Customs.	The whole act.
21 & 22 Vict. c. 17	Supply (No. 3) Act 1858	An Act to apply the Sum of Eleven Millions out of the Consolidated Fund to the Service of the Year One thousand eight hundred and fifty-eight.	The whole act.
21 & 22 Vict. c. 22	Franchise Prisons Abolition Act 1858	An Act to abolish Franchise Prisons.	Section Three.
21 & 22 Vict. c. 25	Births and Deaths Registration Act 1858	An Act to amend the Act concerning non-parochial Registers, and the Acts for Marriages, and for registering Births, Deaths, and Marriages in England, and concerning Vaccination.	Section Four to "repealed; and".
21 & 22 Vict. c. 26	Property Qualification for Members of Parliament Act 1858	An Act to abolish the Property Qualifications of Members of Parliament.	The whole act.
21 & 22 Vict. c. 28	Peace Preservation (Ireland) Act 1858	An Act to continue the Peace Preservation (Ireland) Act, 1856.	The whole act.
21 & 22 Vict. c. 32	Validation of Acts of Late Chief Justice of Bombay Act 1858	Repealed as to all Her Majesty's Dominions.	
21 & 22 Vict. c. 34	Railways (Ireland) Act 1858	An Act to continue "The Railways Act (Ireland) 1851."	The whole act.
21 & 22 Vict. c. 38	Reduction of National Debt Act 1858	An Act to repeal certain Provisions for the Issue out of the Consolidated Fund of fixed Amounts for the Reduction of the Funded Debt.	The whole act.
21 & 22 Vict. c. 39	Militia Ballot Suspension Act 1858	An Act to suspend the making of Lists and the Ballot for the Militia of the United Kingdom.	The whole act.
21 & 22 Vict. c. 41	Navigations (Ireland) Act 1858	An Act to amend the Time for making Advances towards Navigation in Ireland, under the Provisions of an Act of the Nineteenth and Twentieth Victoria, Chapter Sixty-two.	The whole act.
21 & 22 Vict. c. 44	Universities and College Estates Act 1858	An Act to grant to the Universities of Oxford and Cambridge certain Interests of their Lessees under proper Reservations and Restrictions.	Section Five.
21 & 22 Vict. c. 51	Roman Catholic Charities Act 1858	An Act to continue the Exemption of certain Charities from the Operation of the Charitable Trusts Acts.	The whole act.
21 & 22 Vict. c. 52	Inferior Courts Officers (Ireland) Act 1858	An Act to make Provision for the Regulation of the Consolidated Nisi Prius Court in Ireland, and to make Provision for the Appointment of Counsel to the Superior Courts of Common Law and Equity in Ireland.	Section Two to "Duties; and" and from "the next" to the end of that Section. Section Three from "Provided always" to "this Act".
21 & 22 Vict. c. 53	Copyhold Commission Act 1858	An Act to continue Appointments under the Act for consolidating the Copyhold and Inclosure Commissions, and for completing Proceedings under the Tithe Commutation Acts.	The whole act.
21 & 22 Vict. c. 55	Army Enlistment Act 1858	An Act to revive and continue an Act amending the Act for limiting the Time of Service in the Army.	The whole act.
21 & 22 Vict. c. 56	Confirmation of Executors (Scotland) Act 1858	An Act to amend the Law relating to the Confirmation of Executors in Scotland, and to extend over all Parts of the United Kingdom the Effect of such Confirmation, and of Grants of Probate and Administration.	Section Nineteen to "repealed; and", and from "may be" to "Parliament, and".
21 & 22 Vict. c. 57	Ecclesiastical Leasing Act 1858	An Act to amend the Act of the Fifth and Sixth Years of Her present Majesty, for enabling Ecclesiastical Corporations, aggregate and sole, to grant Leases for long Terms of Years.	Section Fourteen, the words "and to the Isle of Man".
21 & 22 Vict. c. 62	Second Annual Inclosure Act 1858	An Act to continue certain Acts to prevent the spreading of contagious or infectious Disorders among Sheep, Cattle, and other Animals.	The whole act.
21 & 22 Vict. c. 63	Contagious Diseases of Sheep Act 1858	An Act to continue certain Turnpike Acts in Great Britain.	The whole act.
21 & 22 Vict. c. 64	Annual Turnpike Acts Continuance Act 1858	An Act to make further Provision for the Practice of Vaccination in Ireland.	Section Five.
21 & 22 Vict. c. 65	Vaccination (Ireland) Act 1858	An Act to amend an Act of the last Session, to render more effectual the Police in Counties and Burghs in Scotland.	Section One.
21 & 22 Vict. c. 67	Returns to Secretary of State Act 1858	An Act to repeal certain Enactments requiring Returns to be made to One of the Secretaries of State.	The whole act.
21 & 22 Vict. c. 72	Landed Estates Court (Ireland) Act 1858	An Act to facilitate the Sale and Transfer of Land in Ireland.	Section Three. Section Six to "So help me God". Section Ten to "Registrar" and from "and Thomson" to "Accountant". Section Eleven. Section Thirteen to "Judge of the said Court a Salary of Two thousand five hundred Pounds a Year each; and". Sections Twenty-three and Twenty-four. Section Twenty-six from "and every Appeal" to the end of that Section. Section Twenty-eight. Section Eighty-eight from "Provided always," to the end of that Section, and so much of the rest of the Section as imposes higher rates of duty than those set out in the Schedule to 29 & 30 Vict. c. 99.
21 & 22 Vict. c. 73	Stipendiary Magistrates Act 1858	An Act to amend the Law concerning the Powers of Stipendiary Magistrates and Justices of the Peace in certain Cases.	Section Eight.
21 & 22 Vict. c. 74	County Courts Act 1858	An Act for the Re-arrangement of the Districts of the County Courts among the Judges thereof.	Section One to "repealed; and". Section Five.
21 & 22 Vict. c. 75	Cheap Trains and Canal Carriers Act 1858	An Act to amend the Law relating to Cheap Trains, and to restrain the Exercise of certain Powers by Canal Companies being also Railway Companies.	Section Four.
21 & 22 Vict. c. 82	Militia Pay Act 1858	An Act to defray the Charge of the Pay of the Non-commissioned Officers.	The whole act.
21 & 22 Vict. c. 83	Universities (Scotland) Act 1858	An Act to make Provision for the better Government and Discipline of the Universities of Scotland, and improving and regulating the Course of Study therein; and for the Union of the Two Universities and Colleges of Aberdeen.	Section Two from "Provided always" to "provided also, that:". Sections Fourteen to Seventeen. Section Nineteen to "Commissioners; but,". Section Twenty. Section Twenty-one from "Provided always" to the end of that Section. Section Twenty-two and Twenty-three.
21 & 22 Vict. c. 85	Militia (No. 2) Act 1858	An Act to continue an Act to authorize Her Majesty to accept the Services of the Militia out of the United Kingdom.	The whole act.
21 & 22 Vict. c. 86	Militia Embodiment Act 1858	An Act further to continue an Act to authorize the embodying of the Militia.	The whole act.
21 & 22 Vict. c. 87	Corrupt Practices Act 1858	An Act to continue and amend the Corrupt Practices Prevention Act, 1854.	Section Three to "repealed; and".
21 & 22 Vict. c. 89	Lunatics (Scotland) Act 1858	An Act to amend an Act of the last Session, for the Regulation of the Care and Treatment of Lunatics, and for the Provision, Maintenance, and Regulation of Lunatic Asylums, in Scotland.	The whole act.
21 & 22 Vict. c. 90	Medical Act 1858	An Act to regulate the Qualifications of Practitioners in Medicine and Surgery.	Section Seventeen. Sections Thirty-two, Thirty-four, Thirty-six, and Thirty-seven, the words "After the First Day of January One thousand eight hundred and fifty-nine". Schedule (B.).
21 & 22 Vict. c. 95	Court of Probate Act 1858	An Act to amend the Act of the Twentieth and Twenty-first Victoria, Chapter Seventy-seven.	Section Four from "and until" to the end of that Section. Sections Nine, Eleven, and Fourteen.
21 & 22 Vict. c. 96	West Indian Incumbered Estates Act 1858	An Act to amend "The West Indian Incumbered Estates Act, 1854".	Sections Three and Five. Repealed as to all Her Majesty's Dominions.
21 & 22 Vict. c. 97	Public Health Act 1858	An Act for vesting in the Privy Council certain Powers for the Protection of the Public Health.	Section Four so far as relates to the salary of the Medical Officer. Section Nine from "and shall" to the end of that Section.
21 & 22 Vict. c. 100	Petty Sessions Clerk (Ireland) Act 1858	An Act to regulate the Office of Clerk of Petty Sessions in Ireland.	Section Four.
21 & 22 Vict. c. 102	Works of Utility, etc., Indemnity Act 1858	An Act to indemnify certain Persons who have formed a voluntary Association for the Disposal of Works of Utility and Ornament by Chance or otherwise as Prizes.	The whole act.
21 & 22 Vict. c. 104	Metropolis Management Amendment Act 1858	An Act to alter and amend the Metropolis Local Management Act (1855), and to extend the Powers of the Metropolitan Board of Works for the Purification of the Thames and the Main Drainage of the Metropolis.	Section Twenty-five.
21 & 22 Vict. c. 107	Appropriation Act 1858	An Act to apply a Sum out of the Consolidated Fund and the Surplus of Ways and Means to the Service of the Year One thousand eight hundred and fifty-eight, and to appropriate the Supplies granted in this Session of Parliament.	The whole act.
21 & 22 Vict. c. 108	Matrimonial Causes Act 1858	An Act to amend the Act of the Twentieth and Twenty-first Victoria, Chapter Eighty-five.	Section Two from "and until" to the end of that Section. Section Eighteen from "but no such Rule" to the end of that Section. Section Nineteen.
22 Vict. c. 2	Anniversary Days Observance Act 1859	An Act to repeal certain Acts and Parts of Acts which relate to the Observance of the Thirtieth of January and other Days.	The whole act.
22 Vict. c. 4	Mutiny Act 1859	An Act for punishing Mutiny and Desertion, and for the better Payment of the Army and their Quarters.	The whole act.
22 Vict. c. 5	Marine Mutiny Act 1859	An Act for the Regulation of Her Majesty's Royal Marine Forces while on shore.	The whole act.
22 Vict. c. 6	Supply Act 1859	An Act to apply the Sum of One million One thousand eight hundred.	The whole act.
22 Vict. c. 7	Supply (No. 2) Act 1859	An Act to apply the Sum of Eleven Millions out of the Consolidated Fund to the Service of the Year One thousand eight hundred and fifty-nine.	The whole act.
22 Vict. c. 11	East India Loan Act 1859	An Act to enable the Secretary of State in Council of India to raise Money in the United Kingdom for the Service of the Government of India.	Section Four from "and the Principal" to the end of that Section. Section Six from "save for" to the end of that Section. Section Seven.
22 Vict. c. 14	Manor Courts Abolition (Ireland) Act 1859	An Act for the Abolition of Manor Courts and the better Recovery of Small Debts in Ireland.	Section One from "Provided also" to the end of that Section. Sections Two and Three. Section Ten, the words "within the County, and" and "of such County".
22 Vict. c. 17	Savings Banks (Ireland) Act 1859	An Act to continue an Act of the Eleventh and Twelfth Years of Her present Majesty, for amending the Laws relating to Savings Banks in Ireland.	The whole act.
22 Vict. c. 21	Medical Act 1859	An Act to amend the Medical Act (1858).	Sections One to Three.
22 Vict. c. 22	Exchequer Bills Act 1859	An Act for raising the Sum of Thirteen million two hundred and seventy-seven thousand five hundred Pounds by Exchequer Bills, for the Service of the Year One thousand eight hundred and fifty-nine.	The whole act.
22 Vict. c. 23	Appropriation Act 1859	An Act to apply a Sum out of the Consolidated Fund to the Service of the Year One thousand eight hundred and fifty-nine, and to appropriate the Supplies granted in this Session of Parliament.	The whole act.
22 Vict. c. 25	Convict Prisons Abroad Act 1859	An Act for the Government of the Convict Prisons in Her Majesty's Dominions abroad.	Section One. Repealed as to all Her Majesty's Dominions.
22 Vict. c. 26	Superannuation Act 1859	An Act to amend the Laws concerning Superannuations and other Allowances to Persons having held Civil Offices in the Public Service.	Section One.
22 Vict. c. 29	Poor Law Charges Act 1859	An Act to continue the Act for charging the Maintenance of certain Paupers upon the Union Funds.	The whole act.
22 & 23 Vict. c. 2	Supply (No. 3) Act 1859	An Act to apply the Sum of Seven Millions out of the Consolidated Fund to the Service of the Year One thousand eight hundred and fifty-nine.	The whole act.
22 & 23 Vict. c. 3	Public Health Act 1859	An Act to amend and make perpetual "The Public Health Act, 1858."	The whole act.
22 & 23 Vict. c. 12	Colonial Affidavits Act 1859	An Act to repeal, as regards the Colony of Victoria, an Act passed in the Fourth Year of King William the Fourth, Chapter Sixty-two.	Section One. Repealed as to all Her Majesty's Dominions.
22 & 23 Vict. c. 15	Militia Ballots Suspension Act 1859	An Act to suspend the making of Lists and the Ballots for the Militia of the United Kingdom.	The whole act.
22 & 23 Vict. c. 18	Income Tax Act 1859	An Act for granting Her Majesty additional Rates of Income Tax; and to reduce the Period of Credit allowed for Payment of the Excise Duty on Malt.	Except Sections Six and Seven.
22 & 23 Vict. c. 20	Military Savings Banks Act 1859	An Act to amend and consolidate the Laws relating to Military Savings Banks.	Section Seven from "and to authorize" to "under such Acts or any of them". Section Eight from "or which may" to "takes effect". Section Eleven.
22 & 23 Vict. c. 21	Queen's Remembrancer Act 1859	An Act to regulate the Office of Queen's Remembrancer, and to amend the Practice and Procedure on the Revenue Side of the Court of Exchequer.	Section One to "Master, and". Section Two, the words "be Remembrancer; and". Section Four to "Office; and", and from "and in the event" to the end of that Section. Section Six. Section Nineteen from "Provided" to the end of that Section. Section Twenty-nine from "and so much" to the end of that Section. Section Thirty-one.
22 & 23 Vict. c. 23	County Cess (Ireland) Act 1859	An Act to continue certain Acts relating to the Collection of County Cess in Ireland.	The whole act.
22 & 23 Vict. c. 25	Linen, etc., Manufacturers (Ireland) Act 1859	An Act to continue certain Acts relating to Linen, Hempen, and other Manufactures in Ireland.	The whole act.
22 & 23 Vict. c. 27	European Troops in India Act 1859	An Act to repeal the Thirty-first Section of the Act of the Sixteenth and Seventeenth Years of Victoria, Chapter Ninety-five, and to alter the Limit of the Number of European Troops to be maintained for local Service in India.	Repealed as to all Her Majesty's Dominions.
22 & 23 Vict. c. 31	Court of Probate Act (Ireland) 1859	An Act to amend the Law relating to Probates and Letters of Administration in Ireland.	Section Two from "and until" to the end of that Section. Sections Five, Seven, and Ten.
22 & 23 Vict. c. 32	County and Borough Police Act 1859	An Act to amend the Law concerning the Police in Counties and Boroughs in England and Wales.	Section Fourteen. Section Twenty-six from "and all Punishment" to the end of that Section.
22 & 23 Vict. c. 34	Cambridge University, etc. Act 1859	An Act to continue the Powers of the Commissioners under an Act of the Nineteenth and Twentieth Years of Her Majesty, concerning the University of Cambridge and the College of King Henry the Sixth at Eton.	The whole act.
22 & 23 Vict. c. 36	Probate Duty Act 1859	An Act to alter the Stamp Duties payable upon Probates of Wills and Letters of Administration, to repeal the Stamp Duties on Licences to exercise the Faculty of Physic, and to amend the Laws relating to Hawkers and Pedlars.	Section Two.
22 & 23 Vict. c. 37	Customs Amendment Act 1859	An Act for the Amendment of the Laws relating to the Customs.	Sections One and Seven. Repealed as to all Her Majesty's Dominions.
22 & 23 Vict. c. 38	Militia Act 1859	An Act further to amend the Laws relating to the Militia.	Section One from "and as respects" to the end of that Section. Sections Two and Three. Section Five to "enrolled; and". Section Eight to "repealed; and", and from "and the Power" to the end of that Section. Section Thirteen.
22 & 23 Vict. c. 40	Royal Naval Reserve (Volunteer) Act 1859	An Act for the Establishment of a Reserve Volunteer Force of Seamen, and for the Government of the same.	Section Eighteen, the words "or in Her Majesty's Indian Forces" (wherever they occur).
22 & 23 Vict. c. 44	Poor Rates Act 1859	An Act to continue the Act for the Exemption of Stock in Trade from Rating.	The whole act.
22 & 23 Vict. c. 45	Ecclesiastical Jurisdiction Act 1859	An Act to continue certain temporary Provisions concerning Ecclesiastical Jurisdiction in England.	The whole act.
22 & 23 Vict. c. 46	Episcopal and Capitular Estates Act 1859	An Act to continue and amend the Act concerning the Management of Episcopal and Capitular Estates in England.	Section Three.
22 & 23 Vict. c. 48	Corrupt Practices Act 1859	An Act to continue the Corrupt Practices Prevention Act, 1854.	The whole act.
22 & 23 Vict. c. 49	Poor Law (Payment of Debts) Act 1859	An Act to provide for the Payment of Debts incurred by Boards of Guardians in Unions and Parishes and Boards of Management in School Districts.	Section Two.
22 & 23 Vict. c. 50	Roman Catholic Charities Act 1859	An Act further to continue the Exemption of certain Charities from the Operation of the Charitable Trusts Acts.	The whole act.
22 & 23 Vict. c. 51	Dublin Police Act 1859	An Act to continue certain Turnpike Acts in Great Britain.	The whole act.
22 & 23 Vict. c. 53	Savings Bank (Charitable Societies) Act 1859	An Act to enable Charitable and Provident Societies and Penny Savings Banks to invest all their Proceeds in Savings Banks.	Section Two.
22 & 23 Vict. c. 54	Militia Pay Act 1859	An Act to defray the Charge of the Pay of the Non-commissioned Officers.	The whole act.
22 & 23 Vict. c. 55	Appropriation (No. 2) Act 1859	An Act to apply a Sum out of the Consolidated Fund and the Surplus of Ways and Means to the Service of the Year One thousand eight hundred and fifty-nine, and to appropriate the Supplies granted in this Session of Parliament.	The whole act.
22 & 23 Vict. c. 56	Weights and Measures Act 1859	An Act to amend the Act of the Fifth and Sixth Years of King William the Fourth, Chapter Sixty-three, relating to Weights and Measures.	Section Nine from "Provided" to the end of that Section.
22 & 23 Vict. c. 61	Matrimonial Causes Act 1859	An Act to make further Provision concerning the Court for Divorce and Matrimonial Causes.	Section Four from "and all Orders" to the end of that Section.
22 & 23 Vict. c. 62	Bankruptcy, etc. (Ireland) Act 1859	An Act to amend the Irish Bankruptcy and Insolvency Act (1857).	The whole act.
23 & 24 Vict. c. 2	Consolidated Fund (£407,649) Act 1860	An Act to apply the Sum of Four hundred and seventy thousand six hundred and forty-nine Pounds out of the Consolidated Fund to the Service of the Year ending the Thirty-first Day of March One thousand eight hundred and sixty.	The whole act.
23 & 24 Vict. c. 3	Consolidated Fund (£4,500,000) Act 1860	An Act to apply the Sum of Four million five hundred thousand Pounds out of the Consolidated Fund to the Service of the Year One thousand eight hundred and sixty.	The whole act.
23 & 24 Vict. c. 7	Medical Acts Amendment Act 1860	An Act to amend the Medical Acts.	Sections Three and Four.
23 & 24 Vict. c. 9	Mutiny Act 1860	An Act for punishing Mutiny and Desertion, and for the better Payment of the Army and their Quarters.	The whole act.
23 & 24 Vict. c. 10	Marine Mutiny Act 1860	An Act for the Regulation of Her Majesty's Royal Marine Forces while on shore.	The whole act.
23 & 24 Vict. c. 12	Consolidated Fund (£850,000) Act	An Act to apply One hundred and fifty thousand Pounds out of the Consolidated Fund to the Service of the Year ending the Thirty-first day of March One thousand eight hundred and sixty.	The whole act.
23 & 24 Vict. c. 14	Income Tax Act 1860	An Act for granting to Her Majesty Duties on Profits arising from Property, Professions, Trades, and Offices.	Sections One to Three. Section Five from "and upon" to "sixty". Sections Eight.
23 & 24 Vict. c. 18	Marriage (Society of Friends) Act 1860	An Act to amend the Acts relating to Marriages in England and Ireland, by extending certain Provisions thereof to Persons professing with the Society of Friends.	Section One from "Provided always" to "Persuasion of the un".
23 & 24 Vict. c. 20	Exchequer Bills Act 1860	An Act for raising the Sum of Thirteen million two hundred and thirty thousand eight hundred and sixty.	The whole act.
23 & 24 Vict. c. 23	Oxford University Act 1860	An Act to provide for the Consideration of an Ordinance which has been laid before Parliament in a Report of the Oxford University Commissioners.	The whole act.
23 & 24 Vict. c. 25	Consolidated Fund (£9,500,000) Act	An Act to apply the Sum of Nine million five hundred thousand Pounds out of the Consolidated Fund to the Service of the Year One thousand eight hundred and sixty.	The whole act.
23 & 24 Vict. c. 26	Common Lodging Houses Act, Ireland, 1860	An Act to remove Doubts as to the Application of "The Common Lodging Houses Acts" to Ireland, and to amend the Provisions of those Acts so far as they relate to Ireland.	Section Three from "the Term 'Local Authority'" to the end of that Section. Section Four to "therefor as to Ireland". Sections Seven and Nine.
23 & 24 Vict. c. 27	Refreshment Houses Act 1860	An Act for granting to Her Majesty certain Duties on Wine Licences and Refreshment Houses, and for regulating the licensing of Refreshment Houses and the granting of Wine Licences.	Section One from "if the House" to "or upwards - 1 1 0". Section Ten from "and every such" to "to this Act". The Schedules.
23 & 24 Vict. c. 28	Repeal of Sir John Barnard's Act 1860	An Act to repeal the Act of the Seventh Year of King George the Second, Chapter Eight, commonly called "Sir John Barnard's Act" and Part of the Act of the Tenth Year of King George the Second, Chapter Eight.	The whole act.
23 & 24 Vict. c. 32	Ecclesiastical Courts Jurisdiction Act 1860	An Act to abolish the Jurisdiction of the Ecclesiastical Courts in Ireland in Cases of Defamation, and in certain Cases of Drawing and the rest of the Section so far as it relates to Ecclesiastical Courts in Ireland.	Section One from "Provided further" to the end of that Section. Section Five.
23 & 24 Vict. c. 33	Bankruptcy (Scotland) Amendment Act 1860	An Act to amend certain Provisions in the Bankrupt Law of Scotland.	Section Six.
23 & 24 Vict. c. 36	Customs Inland Bonding Act 1860	An Act to authorize the Appointment and Approval of Places for the warehousing of Goods for the Security of Duties of Customs.	Sections Five to Seven.
23 & 24 Vict. c. 41	Railways and Canals Act 1860	An Act to make perpetual an Act of the Twenty-first and Twenty-second Years of Her present Majesty, to amend the Law relating to Cheap Trains, and to restrain the Exercise of certain Powers by Canal Companies being also Railway Companies.	The whole act.
23 & 24 Vict. c. 47	Burgesses (Scotland) Act 1860	An Act to amend the Law relative to the Legal Qualification of Councillors and the Admission of Burgesses in Royal Burghs in Scotland.	Section One.
23 & 24 Vict. c. 51	Local Taxation Returns Act 1860	An Act to provide for an annual Return of Rates, Taxes, Tolls, and Dues levied for local Purposes in England.	Section One from "the First" to the end of that Section.
23 & 24 Vict. c. 54	Court of Queen's Bench Act Amendment Act	An Act to amend an Act for abolishing certain Offices on the Crown Side of the Court of Queen's Bench, and for regulating the Crown Office.	Section One to "abolished; and". Section Two from "Provided always" to the end of that Section.
23 & 24 Vict. c. 57	Dominica Loan Act 1860	An Act to authorize an Extension of the Time for Repayment of a Loan made by the West India Relief Commissioners to the Island of Dominica.	Repealed as to all Her Majesty's Dominions.
23 & 24 Vict. c. 60	Queen's Prison Act 1860	An Act to amend the Act for regulating the Queen's Prison.	The whole act.
23 & 24 Vict. c. 61	Census Act 1860	An Act for taking the Census of England.	The whole act.
23 & 24 Vict. c. 62	Census Act (No. 2) 1860	An Act for taking the Census of Ireland.	The whole act.
23 & 24 Vict. c. 67	Highway Rates Act 1860	An Act to continue an Act for authorising the Application of Highway Rates to Turnpike Roads.	The whole act.
23 & 24 Vict. c. 68	South Wales Highways Act 1860	An Act for the better Management and Control of the Highways in South Wales.	Section Thirty-three from "Provided" to the end of that Section. Section Thirty-four.
23 & 24 Vict. c. 73	Annual Turnpike Acts Continuance Act 1860	An Act to continue certain Turnpike Acts in Great Britain, and to extend the Provisions of the Act of the Fourteenth and Fifteenth Years of Her present Majesty, Chapter Thirty-eight.	The whole act.
23 & 24 Vict. c. 79	Sheriff Court Houses Act 1860	An Act to provide additional Accommodation for the Sheriff Courts in Scotland.	Section Eighteen from "Provided also," to the end of that Section.
23 & 24 Vict. c. 80	Heritable Securities (Scotland) Act 1860	An Act to regulate the Levying and Collection of the Inventory Duty payable upon Heritable Securities and other Property in Scotland.	Section Nine.
23 & 24 Vict. c. 81	Copyhold Commission Continuance Act 1860	An Act to continue Appointments under the Act for consolidating the Copyhold and Inclosure Commissions, and for completing Proceedings under the Tithe Commutation Acts.	The whole act.
23 & 24 Vict. c. 85	Registration of Births, Deaths, and Marriages (Scotland) Act 1860	An Act to amend Two Acts of the Seventeenth and Eighteenth Years, and of the Eighteenth Year, of Her present Majesty, relating to the Registration of Births, Deaths, and Marriages in Scotland.	Section One. Section Four to "repealed; and". Section Nine to "Provided", and the word "That". Section Ten to "Act, and". Section Twenty to "Sixty-one, and".
23 & 24 Vict. c. 88	Admiralty Jurisdiction (India) Act 1860	An Act to extend certain Provisions for Admiralty Jurisdiction in the Colonies to Her Majesty's Territories in India.	Section One to "repealed; and". Repealed as to all Her Majesty's Dominions.
23 & 24 Vict. c. 90	Game Licences Act 1860	An Act to repeal the Duties on Game Certificates and Certificates to deal in Game, and to impose in lieu thereof Duties on Excise Licences and Certificates, for the like Purposes.	Section One. Section Two to "repealed". Section Fourteen, the words "obtaining a Licence from the said Justices as aforesaid". Section Nineteen.
23 & 24 Vict. c. 92	Herring Fisheries (Scotland) Act 1860	An Act to amend the Law relative to the Scottish Herring Fisheries.	Sections Eight and Nine.
23 & 24 Vict. c. 94	Militia (Storehouses) Act 1860	An Act to amend the Laws relating to the Militia.	Section Thirteen.
23 & 24 Vict. c. 98	Census (Scotland) Act 1860	An Act for taking the Census in Scotland.	The whole act.
23 & 24 Vict. c. 99	Corrupt Practices 1854, Act Continuance Act 1860	An Act to continue the Corrupt Practices Prevention Act (1854).	The whole act.
23 & 24 Vict. c. 101	Poor Law Board Continuance Act 1860	An Act to continue the Poor Law Board.	The whole act.
23 & 24 Vict. c. 102	East India Stock Act 1860	An Act to provide for the Management of East India Stock, and of the Debts and Obligations of the Government of India, at and by the Bank of England.	Sections One to Five.
23 & 24 Vict. c. 103	Consolidated Fund (£10,000,000) Act 1860	An Act to apply the Sum of Ten Millions out of the Consolidated Fund to the Service of the Year One thousand eight hundred and sixty.	The whole act.
23 & 24 Vict. c. 105	Prisons (Scotland) Act 1860	An Act to provide for the Management of the General Prison at Perth, and for the Administration of the Local Prisons in Scotland.	Section Forty-nine.
23 & 24 Vict. c. 106	Lands Clauses Consolidation Acts Amendment Act 1860	An Act to amend the Lands Clauses Consolidation Acts.	Section One.
23 & 24 Vict. c. 107	Refreshment Houses (Ireland) Act 1860	An Act for granting to Her Majesty certain Duties on Wine Licences and Refreshment Houses, and for regulating the licensing of Refreshment Houses and the granting of Wine Licences, in Ireland.	Section One from "if the House" to "or upwards - 1 1 0".
23 & 24 Vict. c. 110	Customs Duties Consolidation Act 1860	An Act to consolidate the Duties of Customs.	Section One; Duties of Customs, &c.:— Paragraphs 1 to 3, 6 to 9, 15 to 16, and 18. Paragraph 19, the words "in regard to which the Conditions of the Act 4 Vict. c. 8. have or shall have been fulfilled" (where they occur); and from "perfumed Spirits" to "to be charged as perfumed Spirits, viz., the Gallon - 0 14 0". Paragraphs 20 to 22. The words "Water, Cologne. See Spirits." Paragraph 25. Paragraph 26 to "not being Ash, Beech, Birch, Elm, Oak, and Wainscot". Section Three, so far as it prohibits the importation into Great Britain and Ireland of extracts and essences of hops and other concentrations thereof. Section Six.
23 & 24 Vict. c. 111	Stamp Duties Act 1860	An Act for granting to Her Majesty certain Duties of Stamps, and to amend the Laws relating to the Stamp Duties.	Section Nineteen to "Provided always, that". Section Twenty.
23 & 24 Vict. c. 112	Defence Act 1860	An Act to make better Provision for acquiring Lands for the Defence of the Realm.	Sections One to Four, Six to Eight, and Thirty-nine.
23 & 24 Vict. c. 113	Excise Act 1860	An Act to grant Duties of Excise on Chicory, and to amend the Laws relating to the Excise.	Section One from "for and upon" to "less Quantity than a Hundred-weight; And". Sections Three and Four. Section Twenty-eight, the third condition. Sections Thirty-four and Thirty-five.
23 & 24 Vict. c. 114	Spirits Act 1860	An Act to reduce into One Act and to amend the Excise Regulations relating to the distilling, rectifying, and dealing in Spirits.	Section Two hundred and two from "except" to "Act; and". Section Two hundred and three from "as to the several" to "sixty, and". Schedule (C.), except as to the Acts 6 Geo. 4. c. 58. and 18 & 19 Vict. c. 94.
23 & 24 Vict. c. 116	County Coroners Act 1860	An Act to amend the Law relating to the Election, Duties, and Payment of County Coroners.	Section One from "and every" to the end of that Section.
23 & 24 Vict. c. 119	Weights and Measures (Ireland) Act 1860	An Act to amend the Law relating to Weights and Measures in Ireland.	Section Three. Section Four to "repealed". Section Ten. Section Twenty-two from "Provided" to the end of that Section.
23 & 24 Vict. c. 120	Militia (Ballot) Act 1860	An Act to amend the Laws relating to the balloting for the Militia in England, and to suspend the making of Lists and Ballots for the Militia of the United Kingdom.	Sections Twenty-seven to Twenty-nine.
23 & 24 Vict. c. 124	Ecclesiastical Commissioners Act 1860	An Act further to amend the Acts relating to the Ecclesiastical Commissioners, and to continue the Powers concerning the Management of Episcopal and Capitular Estates in England.	Section Forty.
23 & 24 Vict. c. 125	Metropolis Gas Act 1860	An Act for better regulating the Supply of Gas to the Metropolis.	Section Fourteen from "Provided that it shall not be lawful" to the end of that Section. Section Thirty-six from "provided that" to the end of that Section. Section Fifty-six.
23 & 24 Vict. c. 127	Solicitors Act 1860	An Act to amend the Laws relating to Attorneys, Solicitors, Proctors, and Certificated Conveyancers.	Section Two from "and where any Person" to the end of that Section. Section Four from "and where any such Person" to the end of that Section. Section Fourteen. And so much of the rest of the Act as requires any attorney or solicitor to take the oath of allegiance.
23 & 24 Vict. c. 129	Excise on Spirits Act 1860	An Act to grant Excise Duties on British Spirits and on Spirits imported from the Channel Islands.	Section One from "on and after the Twenty-ninth" to "One Penny; And". Section Two from "on and after the Twenty-eighth" to "and Sixpence; And". Section Six.
23 & 24 Vict. c. 131	Appropriation Act 1860	An Act to apply a Sum out of the Consolidated Fund and the Surplus of Ways and Means to the Service of the Year One thousand eight hundred and sixty, and to appropriate the Supplies granted in this Session of Parliament.	The whole act.
23 & 24 Vict. c. 132	Exchequer Bonds and Bills Act 1860	An Act for raising the Sum of Two million Pounds by Exchequer Bills or Exchequer Bills for the Service of the Year One thousand eight hundred and sixty.	The whole act.
23 & 24 Vict. c. 133	Militia Pay Act 1860	An Act to defray the Charge of the Pay of the Non-commissioned Officers.	The whole act.
23 & 24 Vict. c. 134	Roman Catholic Charities Act 1860	An Act to amend the Law regarding Roman Catholic Charities.	Section Four.
23 & 24 Vict. c. 136	Charitable Trusts Act 1860	An Act to amend the Law relating to the Administration of Endowed Charities.	Section Twenty-four. So much of the rest of the Act as relates to district courts of bankruptcy.
23 & 24 Vict. c. 138	Peace Preservation (Ireland) Act 1860	An Act to continue and amend the Peace Preservation (Ireland) Act 1856.	The whole act.
23 & 24 Vict. c. 141	Party Emblems (Ireland) Act 1860	An Act to amend an Act passed in the Thirteenth Year of Her Majesty, to restrain Party Processions in Ireland.	The whole act.
23 & 24 Vict. c. 142	Union of Benefices Act 1860	An Act to make better Provision for the Union of contiguous Benefices in Cities, Towns, and Boroughs.	Section Thirty from "and the Provisions" to the end of that Section.
23 & 24 Vict. c. 144	Matrimonial Causes Act 1860	An Act to amend the Procedure and Powers of the Court for Divorce and Matrimonial Causes.	Section Four from "Section Two" to the end of that Section.
23 & 24 Vict. c. 148	Poor Law Commissioners (Ireland) Continuance Act 1860	An Act to continue the Powers of the Poor Law Commissioners in Ireland.	The whole act.
23 & 24 Vict. c. 149	Court of Chancery Act 1860	An Act to make better Provision for the Relief of Prisoners in Contempt of the High Court of Chancery, and Pauper Defendants; and for the more efficient Despatch of Business in the said Court.	Section One. Section Seven. Section Nine from "such additional Salary to be" to "Fee Fund Account", and from "to be payable" to "last aforesaid". Sections Ten and Eleven.
23 & 24 Vict. c. 154	Landlord and Tenant Law Amendment (Ireland) Act 1860	An Act to consolidate and amend the Law of Landlord and Tenant in Ireland.	Section Twenty-one and four from "and except so far as may be necessary" to the end of that Section.
24 & 25 Vict. c. 2	Consolidated Fund (4,000,000) Act	An Act to apply the Sum of Four Millions out of the Consolidated Fund to the Service of the Year One thousand eight hundred and sixty-one.	The whole act.
24 & 25 Vict. c. 4	Red Sea and India Telegraph Company Act 1861	An Act for amending the Red Sea and India Telegraph Act, 1859.	The whole act.
24 & 25 Vict. c. 6	Consolidated Fund (3,000,000) Act	An Act to apply the Sum of Three Millions out of the Consolidated Fund to the Service of the Year One thousand eight hundred and sixty-one.	The whole act.
24 & 25 Vict. c. 7	Mutiny Act 1861	An Act for punishing Mutiny and Desertion, and for the better Payment of the Army and their Quarters.	The whole act.
24 & 25 Vict. c. 8	Marine Mutiny Act 1861	An Act for the Regulation of Her Majesty's Royal Marine Forces while on shore.	The whole act.
24 & 25 Vict. c. 10	Admiralty Court Act 1861	An Act to extend the Jurisdiction and improve the Practice of the High Court of Admiralty.	Section Twenty-nine. Section Thirty from "nothing" to the end of that Section. Section Thirty-one.
24 & 25 Vict. c. 12	County Contributions to Prisons, etc. Act 1861	An Act for the Abolition of Contributions by Counties for the Relief of Prisoners in the Queen's Prison, and for the Benefit of Bethlem Hospital.	The whole act.
24 & 25 Vict. c. 19	Consolidated Fund (10,000,000) Act	An Act to apply the Sum of Ten Millions out of the Consolidated Fund to the Service of the Year One thousand eight hundred and sixty-one.	The whole act.
24 & 25 Vict. c. 20	Customs and Inland Revenue Act 1861	An Act to continue certain Duties of Customs and Inland Revenue for the Service of Her Majesty, and to alter and repeal certain other Duties.	The whole act.
24 & 25 Vict. c. 21	Revenue (No. 1) Act 1861	An Act for granting to Her Majesty certain Duties of Stamps.	Section One from "which said Duties" to the end of that Section. Section Five. Section Seven from "the Licences" to "Duties thereon, nor". Schedule (B.) form of Licence to be taken out by any Hawker or Pedlar "under any other Act now in force".
24 & 25 Vict. c. 26	Dublin Improvement Act Amendment Act 1861	An Act to amend the Dublin Improvement Act, 1849.	Section Thirteen.
24 & 25 Vict. c. 34	Improvement of Land (Ireland) Act 1861	An Act to extend the Provisions of the Act to facilitate the Improvement of Landed Property in Ireland, and to further provide for the Erection of Dwellings for the Labouring Poor in Ireland.	The whole act.
24 & 25 Vict. c. 37	Poor Law (Scotland) (No. 2) Act 1861	An Act to simplify the Mode of raising the Assessment for the Poor in Scotland.	From "and until" to "in such Parish", and from "Provided always" to the end of the Act.
24 & 25 Vict. c. 47	Harbours and Passing Tolls, &c. Act 1861	An Act to facilitate the Construction and Improvement of Harbours by authorizing Loans to Harbour Authorities; to abolish Passing Tolls; and for other Purposes.	Section Three, Sub-section (7.), from "not exceeding" to "1853". Sections Nine and Eleven to Thirteen. The Second Schedule.
24 & 25 Vict. c. 53	University Elections Act 1861	An Act to provide that Votes at Elections for the Universities may be recorded by means of Voting Papers.	Section Two, as to the form of declaration thereby prescribed.
24 & 25 Vict. c. 55	Poor Removal Act 1861	An Act to amend the Laws regarding the Removal of the Poor and the Contribution of Parishes to the Common Fund in Unions.	Section Five. Section Seven from "Provided" to the end of that Section. Section Nine from "Provided always" to the end of that Section.
24 & 25 Vict. c. 57	Private Lunatic Asylums (Ireland) Act 1861	An Act to continue an Act of the Fifth and Sixth Years of Her Majesty relating to private Lunatic Asylums in Ireland.	The whole act.
24 & 25 Vict. c. 58	County Cess (Ireland) Act 1861	An Act to continue an Act of the Eleventh and Twelfth Years of Her Majesty relating to the Collection of County Cess in Ireland.	The whole act.
24 & 25 Vict. c. 59	Vaccination Acts Amendment Act 186	An Act to facilitate Proceedings before Justices under the Acts relating to Vaccination.	The whole Act, so far as relates to Ireland.
24 & 25 Vict. c. 62	Crown Suits Act 1861	An Act to amend the Act of the Ninth Year of King George the Third, Chapter Sixteen, for quieting Possessions and Titles against the Crown, and also certain Acts for the like Object relating to Suits by the Duke of Cornwall.	Section Five.
24 & 25 Vict. c. 64	Annual Turnpike Acts Continuance Act 1861	An Act to continue certain Turnpike Acts in Great Britain.	The whole act.
24 & 25 Vict. c. 65	Ordnance Survey Continuance Act 1861	An Act to continue the Survey of Great Britain, Berwick-upon-Tweed, and the Isle of Man.	The whole act.
24 & 25 Vict. c. 68	Solicitors (Ireland) Act 1861	An Act to amend the Laws relating to Attorneys and Solicitors in Ireland.	The whole act.
24 & 25 Vict. c. 74	Enlistment of Persons Transferred from the Indian Forces Act 1861	Repealed as to all Her Majesty's Dominions.	
24 & 25 Vict. c. 75	Municipal Corporations Act Amendment Act 1861	An Act for amending the Municipal Corporations Act.	Section Four from "and that all Licences" to the end of that Section.
24 & 25 Vict. c. 76	Poor Removal (No. 2) Act 1861	An Act to amend the Law relating to the Removal of poor Persons to Ireland.	Sections Five and Seven.
24 & 25 Vict. c. 79	Metropolis Gas Act 1861	An Act to amend the Metropolitan Gas Act.	Section Two.
24 & 25 Vict. c. 83	County Voters Registration (Scotland) Act 1861	An Act to amend the Law regarding the Registration of County Voters in Scotland.	Section Three to "Act; and". Section Six from "in" to "sixty-two, and", and the word "thereafter". Section Eight from "in" to "sixty-two, and", and the word "thereafter". Section Thirty-one from "Provided" to the end of that Section. Section Thirty-four and Thirty-six. Section Thirty-seven from "and the Lord Ordinary" to the end of that Section. Section Forty from "the said Person; and". Section Forty-six.
24 & 25 Vict. c. 84	Trusts (Scotland) Act 1861	An Act to amend the Law in Scotland relative to the Resignation, Powers, and Liabilities of gratuitous Trustees.	Section Two from "nor any" to the end of that Section.
24 & 25 Vict. c. 85	Public Works (Ireland) Act 1861	An Act to authorize for a further Period the Application of Money for the Purposes of Loans for carrying on Public Works in Ireland.	The whole act.
24 & 25 Vict. c. 86	Conjugal Rights (Scotland) Amendment Act 1861	An Act to amend the Law regarding Conjugal Rights in Scotland.	Section Thirteen to "it is hereby enacted, that". Section Fourteen, except so far as it relates to Benjamin Robert Bell. Sections Eighteen and Twenty-one.
24 & 25 Vict. c. 89	Pensions, British Forces (India) Act 1861	Repealed as to all Her Majesty's Dominions.	
24 & 25 Vict. c. 91	Revenue (No. 2) Act 1861	An Act to amend the Laws relating to the Inland Revenue.	Section One, the words "of Two Pounds and Ten shillings", and from "and so far" to the end of that Section. Section Fourteen from "on and after" to "sixty-one", from "every Person" to "Period of such Licence"; and the words "after the said Tenth Day of October". Sections Sixteen, Twenty-four, and Forty-two.
24 & 25 Vict. c. 103	Appropriation Act 1861	An Act to apply a Sum out of the Consolidated Fund and the Surplus of Ways and Means to the Service of the Year One thousand eight hundred and sixty-one, and to appropriate the Supplies granted in this Session of Parliament.	The whole act.
24 & 25 Vict. c. 109	Salmon Fishery Act 1861	An Act to amend the Laws relating to Fisheries of Salmon in England.	Section Thirty-nine. The Schedule.
24 & 25 Vict. c. 112	Birkenhead Enfranchisement Act 1861	An Act for the Appropriation of the Seats vacated by the Disenfranchisement of the Boroughs of Sudbury and Saint Alban.	Sections One to Eight. Section Eleven to "Parliament," and from "with this" to the end of that Section. Section Thirteen.
24 & 25 Vict. c. 119	Militia Pay Act 1861	An Act to defray the Charge of the Pay and authorize the Employment of the Non-commissioned Officers.	The whole act.
24 & 25 Vict. c. 120	Militia Ballots Suspension Act 1861	An Act to suspend the making of Lists and the Ballots for the Militia of the United Kingdom.	The whole act.
24 & 25 Vict. c. 122	Corrupt Practices Act 1861	An Act to continue the Corrupt Practices Prevention Act (1854).	The whole act.
24 & 25 Vict. c. 123	Landed Estates Court (Ireland) Act 1861	An Act to reduce and alter the Rate of Duty payable on Proceedings under the Statute of the Twenty-first and Twenty-second Years of Victoria, Chapter Seventy-two, Section Eighty-eight; and for other Purposes.	Section Three.
24 & 25 Vict. c. 131	Episcopal and Capitular Estates Act 1861	An Act to continue the Act concerning the Management of Episcopal and Capitular Estates in England, and further to amend certain Acts relating to the Ecclesiastical Commissioners for England.	Section Two.
25 & 26 Vict. c. 1	Consolidated Fund (£973,747) Act	An Act to apply the Sum of Nine hundred and seventy-three thousand seven hundred and forty-seven Pounds out of the Consolidated Fund to the Service of the Year ending the Thirty-first Day of March One thousand eight hundred and sixty-two.	The whole act.
25 & 26 Vict. c. 2	Consolidated Fund (£18,000,000) Act	An Act to apply the Sum of Eighteen Millions out of the Consolidated Fund to the Service of the Year One thousand eight hundred and sixty-two.	The whole act.
25 & 26 Vict. c. 5	Mutiny Act 1862	An Act for punishing Mutiny and Desertion, and for the better Payment of the Army and their Quarters.	The whole act.
25 & 26 Vict. c. 6	Marine Mutiny Act 1862	An Act for the Regulation of Her Majesty's Royal Marine Forces while on shore.	The whole act.
25 & 26 Vict. c. 9	Sir J. Soane's Museum Act 1862	An Act to enable the Trustees of Sir John Soane's Museum to send Works of Art to the International Exhibition, 1862.	The whole act.
25 & 26 Vict. c. 12	Protection of Inventions and Designs Amendment Act 1862	An Act for the Protection of Inventions and Designs exhibited at the International Exhibition of Industry and Art for the Year One thousand eight hundred and sixty-two.	The whole act.
25 & 26 Vict. c. 13	Exchequer Bonds Act 1862	An Act for raising the Sum of One Million Pounds by Exchequer Bonds for the Service of the Year One thousand eight hundred and sixty-two.	The whole act.
25 & 26 Vict. c. 14	Crown Suits (Isle of Man) Act 1862	An Act to extend to the Isle of Man the Provisions of the Act Eighteenth and Nineteenth Victoria, Chapter Ninety, as to the Payment of Costs to and by the Crown.	Section Two.
25 & 26 Vict. c. 15	College of Physicians (Ireland) Act 1862	An Act to define the Powers of the President and Fellows of the King and Queen's College of Physicians in Ireland with respect to the Election of its Fellows.	Sections One and Two. Section Three to "this Act".
25 & 26 Vict. c. 19	General Pier and Harbour Act 1861 Amendment Act	An Act to amend the General Pier and Harbour Act, 1861.	Sections Two, Twenty-three, and Twenty-four. Schedules (A.) and (C.).
25 & 26 Vict. c. 22	Revenue Act 1862	An Act to continue certain Duties of Customs and Inland Revenue for the Service of Her Majesty, and to grant, alter, and repeal certain other Duties.	Section One from "in addition to Schedule D., and from "shall respectively" to "Duration thereof, and". Section Two from "or as respects" to "forty-two". Section Three from "shall expire" to "Year, and". Section Eight, the words "for the first Time". Sections Fourteen and Seventeen to Nineteen. Section Twenty from "and of an Act" to "sixty-two". Sections Twenty-one to Twenty-seven. Sections Thirty and Thirty-one, except so to makers of cards. Sections Forty, Forty-two, and Forty-four. Schedule (A.) from "the Duties of Customs now charged" to "of such proof Spirit". Schedule (B.) from "on a Victualler's occasional Licence" to "the Sum of - 0 5 0". Schedule (C.), the words "if he be not a Maker of playing Cards, the Duty of - 0 2 6". Schedule (D.).
25 & 26 Vict. c. 24	Peace Preservation (Ireland) Act Continuance Act 1862	An Act to continue The Peace Preservation (Ireland) Act, 1856, as amended by the Act of the Twenty-third and Twenty-fourth Victoria, Chapter One hundred and thirty-eight.	The whole act.
25 & 26 Vict. c. 27	British Forces in India Act 1862	Repealed as to all Her Majesty's Dominions.	
25 & 26 Vict. c. 28	Universities (Scotland) Act 1862	An Act to alter and amend the Universities (Scotland) Act in so far as it relates to the Bequest of the late Doctor Alexander Murray in the University of Aberdeen.	The whole act.
25 & 26 Vict. c. 29		An Act to amend and enlarge the Acts for the Improvement of Landed Property in Ireland.	Sections One, Two, and Five.
25 & 26 Vict. c. 31	Landed Property Improvement (Ireland) Act 1862	An Act to apply the Sum of Ten Millions out of the Consolidated Fund to the Service of the Year One thousand eight hundred and sixty-two.	The whole act.
25 & 26 Vict. c. 32	Consolidated Fund (£10,000,000) Act	An Act to continue the Act of the Second and Third Years of Victoria, Chapter Seventy-four, for preventing the administering of unlawful Oaths in Ireland, as amended by an Act of the Eleventh and Twelfth Years of Victoria.	The whole act.
25 & 26 Vict. c. 44	Discharged Prisoners' Aid Act 1862	An Act to amend the Law relating to the giving of Aid to discharged Prisoners.	Section One from "and to be" to the end of that Section.
25 & 26 Vict. c. 48	New Zealand Constitution Act 1862	An Act respecting the Establishment and Government of Provinces in New Zealand, and to enable the Legislature of New Zealand to repeal the Seventy-third Section of an Act intituled An Act to grant a Representative Constitution to the Colony of New Zealand.	Sections One and Six. Repealed as to all Her Majesty's Dominions.
25 & 26 Vict. c. 53	Land Registry Act 1862	An Act to facilitate the Proof of Title to, and the Conveyance of, Real Estates.	Section Sixty-two, the words "out of the Suitors Fee Fund". Section One hundred and twenty-one, the words "out of the Suitors Fee Fund".
25 & 26 Vict. c. 54	Lunacy (Scotland) Act 1862	An Act to make further Provision respecting Lunacy in Scotland.	Section Two.
25 & 26 Vict. c. 58	Parochial Buildings (Scotland) Act 1862	An Act to make further Provision with respect to the raising of Money for erecting and improving Parochial Buildings in Scotland.	Section One, the words "School House and Schoolmaster's House".
25 & 26 Vict. c. 61	Highway Act 1862	An Act for the better management of Highways in England.	Section Nine, Sub-section Seven. Section Forty-three, the words "not exceeding Five Pounds".
25 & 26 Vict. c. 62	County Elections (Ireland) Act 1862	An Act to amend the Law relating to the Duration of contested Elections for Counties in Ireland, and for establishing additional Places for taking the Poll in such Elections.	Sections One and Three. Section Four, the words "which shall take place after the passing of this Act" and from "Provided always, that in case" to the end of that Section. Section Seven, the words "after the Commencement of this Act".
25 & 26 Vict. c. 63	Merchant Shipping Act Amendment Act 1862	An Act to amend "The Merchant Shipping Act, 1854," "The Merchant Shipping Act Amendment Act, 1855," and "The Customs Consolidation Act, 1853".	Section Two. Table (A.) in the Schedule.
25 & 26 Vict. c. 67	Declaration of Title Act 1862	An Act for obtaining a Declaration of Title.	Section Forty-two, the words "out of the Suitors Fee Fund".
25 & 26 Vict. c. 69	Harbours Transfer Act 1862	An Act for transferring from the Admiralty to the Board of Trade certain Powers and Duties relative to Harbours and Navigation under Local and other Acts; and for other Purposes.	Sections Eleven and Twelve. Section Nineteen, Sub-section Four. Section Twenty-two.
25 & 26 Vict. c. 71	Appropriation Act 1862	An Act to apply a Sum out of the Consolidated Fund and the Surplus of Ways and Means to the Service of the Year One thousand eight hundred and sixty-two, and to appropriate the Supplies granted in this Session of Parliament.	The whole act.
25 & 26 Vict. c. 72	Annual Turnpike Acts Continuance Act 1862	An Act to continue certain Turnpike Acts in Great Britain.	The whole act.
25 & 26 Vict. c. 73	Copyhold, etc., Commission Continuance Act 1862	An Act for continuing the Copyhold, Inclosure, and Tithe Commission, and entitling the Commissioners to Superannuation Allowances.	Section One.
25 & 26 Vict. c. 75	Savings Banks (Ireland) Continuance Act 1862	An Act to revive and continue an Act for amending the Laws relating to Savings Banks in Ireland.	The whole act.
25 & 26 Vict. c. 76	Weights and Measures (Ireland) Amendment Act 1862	An Act to amend "The Weights and Measures (Ireland) Act, 1860," to abolish local and customary Denominations of Weight, and to regulate the Mode of weighing Articles sold in Ireland.	Section One until "this Act". Section Five to "this Act". Section Six from "and any" to the end of that Section. Section Nine from "before the close" to "Act, and" and the word "succeeding". Section Ten from "in the Year" to "such Quarter Sessions" and the word "succeeding".
25 & 26 Vict. c. 77	Militia Ballots Suspension Act 1862	An Act to suspend the making of Lists and the Ballots for the Militia of the United Kingdom.	The whole act.
25 & 26 Vict. c. 80	Militia Pay Act 1862	An Act to defray the Charge of the Pay and authorise the Employment of the Non-commissioned Officers.	The whole act.
25 & 26 Vict. c. 81	Perpetuation of Matrimonial Causes Act 1860 Act 1862	An Act to make perpetual An Act to amend the Procedure and Powers of the Court for Divorce and Matrimonial Causes.	The whole act.
25 & 26 Vict. c. 83	Poor Relief (Ireland) Act 1862	An Act to amend the Laws in force for the Relief of the destitute Poor in Ireland, and to continue the Powers of the Commissioners.	Section Twenty-six.
25 & 26 Vict. c. 84	Excise Duties Act 1862	An Act to continue the Duties of Excise on Sugar made in the United Kingdom, and to amend the Laws relating to the Duties of Excise.	Section One.
25 & 26 Vict. c. 86	Lunacy Regulation Act 1862	An Act to amend the Law relating to Commissions of Lunacy and the Proceedings under the same, and to provide more effectually for the visiting of Lunatics, and for other Purposes.	Sections Twenty-two and Twenty-three. Section Twenty-five from "so much" to the end of that Section.
25 & 26 Vict. c. 87	Industrial and Provident Societies Act 1862	An Act to consolidate and amend the Laws relating to Industrial and Provident Societies.	Section One. The Schedule.
25 & 26 Vict. c. 89	Companies Act 1862	An Act for the Incorporation, Regulation, and Winding-up of Trading Companies and other Associations.	Section One hundred and twenty-six, the words "The Commissioners of the Court of Bankruptcy, and" and "Commissioners of the Court of Bankruptcy". Section Two hundred and six, Sub-section Four. Sections Two hundred and seven, Two hundred and eleven, and Two hundred and twelve.
25 & 26 Vict. c. 92	Elections (Ireland) Act 1862	An Act to limit the Time for proceeding to Elections in Counties and Boroughs in Ireland.	Section Two to "Repealed". Section Four, the words "issued after the Commencement of this Act".
25 & 26 Vict. c. 97	Salmon Fisheries (Scotland) Act 1862	An Act to regulate and amend the Law respecting the Salmon Fisheries of Scotland.	Section Three. Section Thirteen, the words "or who shall discharge into any River Sawdust".
25 & 26 Vict. c. 101	General Police and Improvement (Scotland) Act 1862	An Act to make more effectual Provision for regulating the Police of Towns and populous Places in Scotland, and for lighting, cleansing, paving, draining, supplying Water to and improving the same, and also for promoting the Public Health thereof.	Section Three from "the Word 'Householder'" to "Six Pounds or upwards".
25 & 26 Vict. c. 102	Metropolis Management Amendment Act 1862	An Act to amend the Metropolis Local Management Acts.	Sections Ninety-two, One hundred and three, and One hundred and thirteen. Section One hundred and fourteen to "enacted, that".
25 & 26 Vict. c. 104	Queen's Prison Discontinuance Act 1862	An Act for the Discontinuance of the Queen's Prison, and Removal of the Prisoners to Whitecross Street Prison.	Section Two from "but all" to "had not passed". Section Three. Section Four, the words "removed or" (wherever they occur). Section Six, the words "removed or". Sections Eight and Nine.
25 & 26 Vict. c. 105	Highland Roads and Bridges Act 1862	An Act to transfer the Roads and Bridges under the Management of the Commissioners of Highland Roads and Bridges to the several Counties in which the same are situate, and to provide for other Matters relating thereto.	Sections Three, Seven, and Eight. Schedule (A.).
25 & 26 Vict. c. 106	County Surveyors (Ireland) Act 1862	An Act to amend the Law relating to the Appointment of County Surveyors in Ireland.	Sections One and Four.
25 & 26 Vict. c. 107	Juries Act 1862	An Act to give greater Facilities for summoning Persons to serve on Juries, and for other Purposes relating thereto.	Section Two. Section Three to "Repeal, and". Section Fifteen.
25 & 26 Vict. c. 109	Corrupt Practices Act, 1854 Continuance Act 1862	An Act to continue the Corrupt Practices Prevention Act (1854).	The whole act.
25 & 26 Vict. c. 110	Union Relief Aid Act 1862	An Act to enable Boards of Guardians of certain Unions to obtain temporary Aid to meet the extraordinary Demands for Relief therein.	The whole act.
25 & 26 Vict. c. 111	Lunacy Acts Amendment Act 1862	An Act to amend the Law relating to Lunatics.	Section Nineteen.
25 & 26 Vict. c. 113	Poor Removal Act 1862	An Act to make Provision for the Removal of poor Persons from England to Scotland, and from Scotland to England and Ireland.	Section Eight.
26 & 27 Vict. c. 2	Bills and Notes (Metropolis) Act 1863	An Act to make Provision concerning Bills of Exchange and Promissory Notes payable in the Metropolis on the Day appointed for the Passage through the Metropolis of Her Royal Highness the Princess Alexandra of Denmark.	The whole act.
26 & 27 Vict. c. 4	Union Relief Aid Continuance Act 1863	An Act to extend for a further Period the Provisions of the Union Relief Act of the last Session.	The whole act.
26 & 27 Vict. c. 5	Naval Coast Volunteers Act 1863	Repealed as to all Her Majesty's Dominions.	
26 & 27 Vict. c. 6	Consolidated Fund (£10,000,000) Act	An Act to apply the Sum of Ten Millions out of the Consolidated Fund to the Service of the Year One thousand eight hundred and sixty-three.	The whole act.
26 & 27 Vict. c. 8	Mutiny Act 1863	An Act for punishing Mutiny and Desertion, and for the better Payment of the Army and their Quarters.	The whole act.
26 & 27 Vict. c. 9	Marine Mutiny Act 1863	An Act for the Regulation of Her Majesty's Royal Marine Forces while on shore.	The whole act.
26 & 27 Vict. c. 11	Registration of Births and Deaths (Ireland) Act 1863	An Act for the Registration of Births and Deaths in Ireland.	Section Four from "Provided always" to the end of that Section. Section Seven from "Provided always" to the end of that Section. Section Eight from "so much" to "repealed; and". Section Twelve. Section Forty-seven from "the First of such" to "Sixty-four".
26 & 27 Vict. c. 12	Secretary at War Abolition Act 1863	An Act to abolish the Office of Secretary at War, and to transfer the Duties of that Office to One of Her Majesty's Principal Secretaries of State.	Section Two from "and the Governor" to the end of that Section. So much of the Schedule as relates to the Acts- 45 Geo. 3. c. 58. 6 Geo. 4. c. 61. 7 Geo. 4. c. 31. 5 & 6 Vict. c. 70. 6 & 7 Vict. c. 95. 18 & 19 Vict. c. 123. 22 & 23 Vict. c. 42. 25 & 26 Vict. c. 5. and Rules and Articles of War made under such last-mentioned Act.
26 & 27 Vict. c. 15	Consolidated Fund (£20,000,000) Act	An Act to apply the Sum of Twenty Millions out of the Consolidated Fund to the Service of the Year One thousand eight hundred and sixty-three.	The whole act.
26 & 27 Vict. c. 16	Exchequer Bonds Act 1863	An Act for raising the Sum of One million Pounds by Exchequer Bonds for the Service of the Year One thousand eight hundred and sixty-three.	The whole act.
26 & 27 Vict. c. 19	Sale of Hares (Ireland) Act 1863	An Act to amend the Law relative to the Sale of Mines in Ireland.	The whole act.
26 & 27 Vict. c. 21	Bastardy (Ireland) Act 1863	An Act to enable certain Boards of Guardians to recover Costs of Maintenance of illegitimate Children in certain Cases in Ireland.	Section One.
26 & 27 Vict. c. 22	Customs and Inland Revenue Act 1863	An Act to grant certain Duties of Customs and Inland Revenue.	Section One.
26 & 27 Vict. c. 23	New Zealand Boundaries Act 1863	Repealed as to all Her Majesty's Dominions.	
26 & 27 Vict. c. 29	Corrupt Practices Prevention Act 1863	An Act to amend and continue the Law relating to Corrupt Practices at Elections of Members of Parliament.	Section Ten from "but such" to the end of that Section.
26 & 27 Vict. c. 33	Revenue Act 1863	An Act for granting to Her Majesty certain Duties of Inland Revenue; and to amend the Laws relating to the Inland Revenue.	Sections Four and Five. Section Twenty-five from "after the Fifth" to "after the last mentioned Day", and from "and every such" to the end of that Section.
26 & 27 Vict. c. 35	South Africa Offences Act 186	An Act for the Prevention and Punishment of Offences committed by Her Majesty's Subjects in South Africa.	Section Six. Repealed as to all Her Majesty's Dominions.
26 & 27 Vict. c. 37	Militia Pay Act 1863	An Act to defray the Charge of the Pay and authorise the Employment of the Non-commissioned Officers.	The whole act.
26 & 27 Vict. c. 48	Mutiny, East Indies Act 1863	Repealed as to all Her Majesty's Dominions.	
26 & 27 Vict. c. 50	Salmon Fisheries (Scotland) Act 1863	An Act to continue the Powers of the Commissioners under the Salmon Fisheries (Scotland) Act until the First Day of January One thousand eight hundred and sixty-five, and to amend the said Act.	Section One. Section Two to "repealed; and".
26 & 27 Vict. c. 51	Passengers Act Amendment Act 1863	An Act to amend the Passengers Act, 1855.	Section Two. Section Three to "repealed, and". Section Four to "repealed, and". Sections Five and Twelve. Repealed as to all Her Majesty's Dominions.
26 & 27 Vict. c. 53	Militia Ballots Suspension Act 1863	An Act to suspend the making of Lists and the Ballots for the Militia of the United Kingdom.	The whole act.
26 & 27 Vict. c. 55	Poor Law Board Continuance Act 1863	An Act to continue the Poor Law Board for a limited Period.	The whole act.
26 & 27 Vict. c. 56	Loan Act 1863	An Act to make perpetual an Act to amend the Laws relating to Loan Societies.	The whole act.
26 & 27 Vict. c. 57	Regimental Debts Act 1863	An Act to consolidate and amend the Acts relating to the Payment of Regimental Debts, and the Distribution of the Effects of Officers and Soldiers in case of Death, and to make like Provision for the Cases of Desertion and Insanity, and other Cases.	Section Three. The Schedule.
26 & 27 Vict. c. 62	Seizure of Crops (Ireland) Act 1863	An Act to amend the Law relating to the Seizure of growing Crops in Ireland.	Section Two from "save" to the end of that Section.
26 & 27 Vict. c. 65	Volunteer Act 1863	An Act to consolidate and amend the Acts relating to the Volunteer Force in Great Britain.	Section Four. Section Fourteen from "every such Regiment" to "are situate". Sections Forty-two, Forty-six, and Fifty-one. Schedule, Part (vi.).
26 & 27 Vict. c. 69	Officers of Royal Naval Reserve Act 1863	An Act to establish Officers of the Royal Naval Reserve.	Section Six.
26 & 27 Vict. c. 76	Colonial Letters Patent Act 1863	An Act to determine the Time at which Letters Patent shall take effect in the Colonies.	Section Four. Repealed as to all Her Majesty's Dominions.
26 & 27 Vict. c. 77	Summary Jurisdiction Act 1863	From "and any Acts" to the end of the Act.	
26 & 27 Vict. c. 89	Poor Removal Act 1863	An Act for the further Amendment of the Law relating to the Removal of poor Persons, Natives of Ireland, from England.	Section Three.
26 & 27 Vict. c. 90	Registration of Marriages (Ireland) Act 1863	An Act to provide for the Registration of Marriages in Ireland.	Sections Two and Five. Section Fourteen from "the First of such" to "Sixty-four".
26 & 27 Vict. c. 91	Union Relief Aid Act 1863	An Act to extend for a further Period the Provisions of the Union Relief Aid Acts.	The whole act.
26 & 27 Vict. c. 94	Annual Turnpike Acts Continuance Act 1863	An Act to amend the Law relating to the Repair of Turnpike Roads in England, and to continue certain Turnpike Acts in Great Britain.	Section Two. The Schedule.
26 & 27 Vict. c. 95	Expiring Laws Continuance Act 1863	An Act for continuing various expiring Acts.	The whole act.
26 & 27 Vict. c. 99	Appropriation Act 1863	An Act to apply a Sum out of the Consolidated Fund and the Surplus of Ways and Means to the Service of the Year One thousand eight hundred and sixty-three, and to appropriate the Supplies granted in this Session of Parliament.	The whole act.
26 & 27 Vict. c. 114	Salmon Fishery (Ireland) Act 1863	An Act to amend the Laws relating to Fisheries in Ireland.	Section Three from "but no" to "passing of this Act". Section Fourteen. Sections Fifteen, Twenty-eight, Thirty-two, Thirty-four, Thirty-six, Forty-seven, Forty-two, and Sixty-seven.
26 & 27 Vict. c. 117	Nuisances Removal Act for England (Amendment) Act 1863	An Act to amend the Nuisances Removal Act for England, 1855, with respect to the Seizure of diseased and unwholesome Meat.	Section One.
26 & 27 Vict. c. 118	Companies Clauses Act 186	An Act for consolidating in One Act certain Provisions frequently inserted in Acts relating to the Constitution and Management of Companies incorporated for carrying on Undertakings of a public Nature.	Section Twenty-one from "but so" to the end of that Section. Section Twenty-two from "not exceeding the Rate prescribed" to "per Annum".
26 & 27 Vict. c. 120	Lord Chancellor's Augmentation Act 1863	An Act for the Augmentation of certain Benefices, and for the Right of Presentation to which is vested in the Lord Chancellor.	Section Thirty-eight from "but" to the end of that Section.
26 & 27 Vict. c. 121	Clergymen Ordained Abroad Act 1863	An Act to establish the Validity of Acts performed in Her Majesty's Possessions abroad by certain Clergymen ordained in Foreign Parts, and to extend the Powers of Colonial Legislatures with respect to such Clergymen.	Repealed as to all Her Majesty's Dominions.
27 & 28 Vict. c. 2	Salary of Sir J. Lawrence Act 1864	An Act to enable the Right Honorable Sir John Laird Mair Lawrence to receive the full Benefit of the Salary of Governor General of India notwithstanding his having received a Pension of an Annuity of Sir John Laird from the East India Company.	The whole act.
27 & 28 Vict. c. 3	Mutiny Act 1864	An Act for punishing Mutiny and Desertion, and for the better Payment of the Army and their Quarters.	The whole act.
27 & 28 Vict. c. 4	Marine Mutiny Act 1864	An Act for the Regulation of Her Majesty's Royal Marine Forces while on shore.	The whole act.
27 & 28 Vict. c. 5	Consolidated Fund (£584,650) Act	An Act to apply the Sum of Five hundred and eighty-four thousand five hundred and fifty Pounds out of the Consolidated Fund to the Service of the Year ending the Thirty-first Day of March One thousand eight hundred and sixty-four.	The whole act.
27 & 28 Vict. c. 6	Consolidated Fund (£4,500,000) Act	An Act to apply the Sum of Four million five hundred thousand Pounds out of the Consolidated Fund to the Service of the Year One thousand eight hundred and sixty-four.	The whole act.
27 & 28 Vict. c. 7	Bills of Exchange (Ireland) Act 1864	An Act to amend the Law relating to Bills of Exchange and Promissory Notes in Ireland.	Section One.
27 & 28 Vict. c. 10	Union Relief Aid Continuance Act 1864	An Act to continue for a further Period certain Provisions of the Union Relief Aid Acts.	The whole act.
27 & 28 Vict. c. 11	Consolidated Fund (£15,000,000) Act	An Act to apply the Sum of Fifteen Millions out of the Consolidated Fund to the Service of the Year One thousand eight hundred and sixty-four.	The whole act.
27 & 28 Vict. c. 12	Warehousing of British Spirits Act 1864	An Act to amend the Laws relating to the warehousing of British Spirits.	Section Thirteen.
27 & 28 Vict. c. 15	Supreme Court (England) (Officers) Act 1864	An Act for making better and further Provision for the more efficient Despatch of Business in the High Court of Chancery.	Section Two. Section Three from "Provided always" to the end of that Section. Section Five from "and such Salary" to the end of that Section. And the rest of the Act except as to John William Hawkins and any junior clerks or assistant clerks appointed thereunder before the passing of the Act 30 & 31 Vict. c. 87.
27 & 28 Vict. c. 16	Appointment of a Judge at Bombay Act 1864	An Act to confirm the Appointment of Henry Pendock St. George Tucker Esquire as One of the Judges of Her Majesty's High Court at Bombay, and to establish the Validity of certain Proceedings therein.	Repealed as to all Her Majesty's Dominions.
27 & 28 Vict. c. 17	Vestry Cess Abolition (Ireland) Act 1864	An Act for the Abolition of Vestry Cess in Ireland, and for other Purposes relating thereto.	Section Four from "and every Person entitled" to "binding upon all Parties". Section Five from "and with like" to the end of that Section. Section Six. The Schedule.
27 & 28 Vict. c. 18	Revenue (No. 1) Act 1864	An Act to grant certain Duties of Customs and Inland Revenue.	Section One, so far as it relates to Schedules (A.), (C.), and (D.), and from "and there shall" to "said Schedule (A.)", and from "shall respectively" to "Duration thereof the same". Section Two from "or as regards" to "herein-after provided)", and from "Provided always" to the end of that Section. Sections Three, Four, and Eight. Schedule (A.). Schedule (B.) from "on Sugar" to "any former Act", and from "if such trading Person as aforesaid" to "the yearly Duty of - 2 0 0". Schedule (D.).
27 & 28 Vict. c. 21	Under Secretaries of State Indemnity Act 1864	An Act to indemnify certain Persons from any penal Consequences which they may have incurred by sitting and voting as Members of the House of Commons while holding the Office of Under Secretary of State.	The whole act.
27 & 28 Vict. c. 28	Common Law Procedure Amendment Act (Ireland) 1864 as to County of Cork Juries	An Act to amend "The Common Law Procedure (Ireland) Act, 1853," in relation to Jurors and Special Juries in the County of Cork.	Section Six from "save that" to "in Ireland".
27 & 28 Vict. c. 29	Insane Prisoners Act 1864	An Act to amend the Act Third and Fourth Victoria, Chapter Fifty-four, for making further Provision for the Confinement and Maintenance of Insane Prisoners.	Sections One and Six.
27 & 28 Vict. c. 34	Fish Teinds (Scotland) Act 1864	An Act for amending the Law relating to Seats in the House of Commons of Persons holding certain Public Offices.	Section Four.
27 & 28 Vict. c. 36	Army Prize (Shares of Deceased) Act 1864	An Act to amend the Law relative to the Payment of the Shares of Prize and other Money belonging to deceased Officers and Soldiers of Her Majesty's Land Forces.	Section Five.
27 & 28 Vict. c. 37	Chimney Sweepers Regulation Act 1864	An Act to amend and extend the Act for the Regulation of Chimney Sweepers.	Sections Two and Eleven.
27 & 28 Vict. c. 43	Government Annuities Act 1864	An Act to grant additional Facilities for the Purchase of small Government Annuities, and for assuring Payments of Money on Death.	Sections Three and Seven.
27 & 28 Vict. c. 47	Penal Servitude Act 1864	An Act to amend the Penal Servitude Acts.	Section Eight from "or if such" to the end of that Section.
27 & 28 Vict. c. 48	Factory Acts Extension Act 1864	An Act for the Extension of the Factory Acts.	Section Six, Sub-sections Two and Three, and Sub-section Six to "Proviso, that".
27 & 28 Vict. c. 56	Revenue (No. 2) Act 1864	An Act for granting to Her Majesty certain Stamp Duties; and to amend the Laws relating to the Inland Revenue.	Section Six, so far as it relates to licences to dealers in gold and silver plate and sellers of playing cards, not being makers thereof. Section Nine. Section Ten, so far as it extends Section One of 1 & 2 Geo. 4. c. 25, Ireland. Section Twelve from "and every such" to "on the said Licence". Section Eighteen.
27 & 28 Vict. c. 59	Lunacy Board (Scotland) Act 1864	An Act to continue the Deputy Commissioners in Lunacy in Scotland, and to make further Provision for the Salaries of the Deputy Commissioners, Medical Secretary, and Clerk of the General Board of Lunacy in Scotland.	Section One.
27 & 28 Vict. c. 63	Militia Ballots Suspension Act 1864	An Act to suspend the making of Lists and the Ballots for the Militia of the United Kingdom.	The whole act.
27 & 28 Vict. c. 64	Public House Closing Act 1864	An Act for further regulating the closing of Public Houses and Refreshment Houses within the Metropolitan Police District, the City of London, certain Corporate Boroughs, and other Places.	Sections Two, Three, and Six. Section Eight, Sub-sections Three and Four. Section Nine.
27 & 28 Vict. c. 69	Militia Pay Act 1864	An Act to defray the Charge of the Pay and authorise the Employment of the Non-commissioned Officers.	The whole act.
27 & 28 Vict. c. 73	Consolidated Fund (Appropriation) Act	An Act to apply a Sum out of the Consolidated Fund and the Surplus of Ways and Means to the Service of the Year One thousand eight hundred and sixty-four, and to appropriate the Supplies granted in this Session of Parliament.	The whole act.
27 & 28 Vict. c. 74	Exchequer Bonds Act 1864	An Act for raising the Sum of One million six hundred thousand Pounds by Exchequer Bonds for the Service of the Year One thousand eight hundred and sixty-four.	The whole act.
27 & 28 Vict. c. 75	Annual Turnpike Acts Continuance Act 186	An Act to amend the Law relating to certain Nuisances on Turnpike Roads, and to continue certain Turnpike Acts in Great Britain.	Sections Two and Three. The Schedule.
27 & 28 Vict. c. 76	Registration of Deeds (Ireland) Act 1864	An Act to make valid defective Registration of Deeds in certain Cases, and to substitute Stamps in lieu of the Fees now payable on Proceedings in the Register of Deeds Office in Ireland.	Section Two from "and if" to the end of that Section.
27 & 28 Vict. c. 84	Expiring Laws Continuance Act 1864	An Act for continuing various expiring Acts.	The whole act.
27 & 28 Vict. c. 85	Contagious Diseases Prevention Act 1864	An Act for the Prevention of Contagious Diseases at certain Naval and Military Stations.	The whole act.
27 & 28 Vict. c. 86	Bank Post Bills Composition (Ireland) Act 1864	An Act to permit for a limited Period Compositions for Stamp Duty on Bank Post Bills of Five Pounds and upwards in Ireland.	The words "during the Period of Three Years from the passing of this Act" and the words "during the Period aforesaid".
27 & 28 Vict. c. 87	Corn Accounts and Returns Act 1864	An Act to amend the Law relating to Publication of Accounts of Corn imported, and to Returns of Purchases and Sales of Corn.	Section One to "the same Day". The Schedule.
27 & 28 Vict. c. 94	Episcopal Church (Scotland) Act 1864	An Act to remove Disabilities affecting the Bishops and Clergy of the Protestant Episcopal Church in Scotland.	Sections One, Three, and Four.
27 & 28 Vict. c. 99	Civil Bill Courts Procedure Amendment Act (Ireland) 1864	An Act to amend the Procedure of the Civil Bill Courts in Ireland.	Sections Fifty-five and Fifty-six. Section Sixty from "except" to the end of that Section.
27 & 28 Vict. c. 101	Highway Act 1864	An Act to amend the Act for the better Management of Highways in England.	Section Six to "enacted, that". Section Ten to "enacted". Section Twenty-seven to "Boards, and". Section Twenty-eight. Section Thirty-two to "enforcing the same". Section Thirty-six to "that is to say".
27 & 28 Vict. c. 105	Poor Removal Act 1864	An Act to explain the Statutes of Her present Majesty for amending the Laws relating to the Removal of the Poor.	Section Two.
27 & 28 Vict. c. 106	Sheriffs Substitute Act 1864	An Act to authorize the Lords Commissioners of the Treasury to make Provision in regard to the Salaries of certain Sheriff Substitute in Scotland.	Section Two.
27 & 28 Vict. c. 114	Improvement of Land Act 1864	The Improvement of Land Act, 1864.	Sections Nineteen.
27 & 28 Vict. c. 118	Salmon Fisheries (Scotland) Act 1864	An Act to amend the Acts relating to Salmon Fisheries in Scotland.	Section Two.
28 & 29 Vict. c. 4	Consolidated Fund (£175,650) Act	An Act to apply the Sum of One hundred and seventy-five thousand six hundred and fifty Pounds out of the Consolidated Fund to the Service of the Year ending the Thirty-first Day of March One thousand eight hundred and sixty-five.	The whole act.
28 & 29 Vict. c. 6	Protection of Inventions and Designs Amendment Act 1865	An Act for the Protection of Inventions and Designs exhibited at the Dublin International Exhibition for the Year One thousand eight hundred and sixty-five.	The whole act.
28 & 29 Vict. c. 9	Affirmations (Scotland) Act 1865	An Act to allow Affirmations or Declarations to be made instead of Oaths in all Civil and Criminal Proceedings in Scotland.	Section One.
28 & 29 Vict. c. 10	Consolidated Fund (£15,000,000) Act	An Act to apply the Sum of Fifteen Millions out of the Consolidated Fund to the Service of the Year One thousand eight hundred and sixty-five.	The whole act.
28 & 29 Vict. c. 11	Mutiny Act 1865	An Act for punishing Mutiny and Desertion, and for the better Payment of the Army and their Quarters.	The whole act.
28 & 29 Vict. c. 12	Marine Mutiny Act 1865	An Act for the Regulation of Her Majesty's Royal Marine Forces while on shore.	The whole act.
28 & 29 Vict. c. 16	Bank of Ireland Act 1865	An Act to make further Provision for the Management of the Unclaimed Dividends of Public Stocks in Ireland, and for the Reduction of the Interest payable on certain Sums advanced by the Bank of Ireland for the Public Service.	Sections One and Two.
28 & 29 Vict. c. 21	Irish Bankrupt and Insolvent Amendment Act 1865	An Act to amend the Irish Bankrupt and Insolvent Act, 1857.	Section Two.
28 & 29 Vict. c. 22	Herring Fisheries (Scotland) Act 1865	An Act to amend the Acts relating to the Scottish Herring Fisheries.	Section One.
28 & 29 Vict. c. 29	Exchequer Bonds Act 1865	An Act for raising the Sum of One million Pounds by Exchequer Bonds for the Service of the Year One thousand eight hundred and sixty-five.	The whole act.
28 & 29 Vict. c. 30	Revenue Act 1865	An Act to grant certain Duties of Customs and Inland Revenue.	Section One, so far as it relates to Schedules (A.) and (C.), and from "shall respectively" to "the same". Section Two from "or as regards" to "herein-after provided)", and from "Provided always" to the end of that Section. Sections Three and Four. Schedule (A.). Schedule (B.) from "and for and in respect" to the end of that Schedule. Schedule (C.).
28 & 29 Vict. c. 33	Vagrancy, Ireland, Amendment Act (1865)	An Act to repeal the Act of the Parliament of Ireland of the Sixth Year of Anne, Chapter Eleven, for explaining and amending the several Acts against Forces, Robbers, and Rapparees.	Section Four.
28 & 29 Vict. c. 34	Metropolitan Houseless Poor Act 1865	An Act to make the Metropolitan Houseless Poor Act perpetual.	Section One from "and the Sixth" to the end of that Section.
28 & 29 Vict. c. 37	County of Sussex Act 1865	An Act to make better Provision respecting the Transaction of County Business and the Administration of Justice at Quarter Sessions in the County of Sussex, and to confirm certain Proceedings of the Justices of the said County.	Section Eighteen.
28 & 29 Vict. c. 42	District Church Tithes Act 1865	An Act to facilitate the Annexation of Tithes to District Churches.	Section Eight from "and when the Approval of the Ecclesiastical" to the end of that Section.
28 & 29 Vict. c. 45	Common Law Courts (Fees) Act 1865	An Act to provide for the Collection by means of Stamps of Fees payable in the Superior Courts of Law at Westminster, and in the Offices belonging thereto.	Section Eight. The Second Schedule.
28 & 29 Vict. c. 47	Militia Pay Act 1865	An Act to defray the Charge of the Pay and authorise the Employment of the Non-commissioned Officers.	The whole act.
28 & 29 Vict. c. 48	Courts of Justice Building Act 1865	An Act to supply Means towards defraying the Expenses of providing Courts of Justice and the various Offices belonging thereto; and for other Purposes.	Section Sixteen from "and for the Purpose" to the end of that Section. Section Seventeen from "and if the Residue" to the end of that Section.
28 & 29 Vict. c. 50	Dogs Regulation (Ireland) Act 1865	An Act for regulating the keeping of Dogs, and for the Protection of Sheep and other Property from Dogs, in Ireland.	Section Two. Sections Six and Eleven, the words "after the Commencement of this Act". Section Eighteen. Section Twenty, the words "after the Commencement of this Act".
28 & 29 Vict. c. 54	Pheasants (Ireland) Act 1865	An Act to alter the Days between which Pheasants may not be killed in Ireland.	Section One.
28 & 29 Vict. c. 62	Poor Rates (Scotland) Act 1865	An Act to provide for the Exemption of Churches and Chapels in Scotland from Poor Rates.	The whole act.
28 & 29 Vict. c. 66	Excise Duty on Malt Act 1865	An Act to allow the charging of the Excise Duty on Malt according to the Weight of the Grain used.	Sections One, Thirteen, and Fourteen.
28 & 29 Vict. c. 70	Constabulary (Ireland) Amendment Act 1865	An Act to alter the Distribution of the Constabulary Force in Ireland, and to make better Provision for the Police Force in the Borough of Belfast.	Section One to "this Act" and from "and all Persons" to "accordingly". Sections Nine and Fourteen.
28 & 29 Vict. c. 75	Sewage Utilization Act 1865	An Act for facilitating the more useful Application of Sewage in Great Britain and Ireland.	The Schedule, so far as it relates to Ireland.
28 & 29 Vict. c. 77	Public House Closing Act 1865	An Act to amend the Act of the Twenty-seventh and Twenty-eighth Victoria, Chapter Sixty-four, commonly called "The Public House Closing Act, 1864".	Section Four.
28 & 29 Vict. c. 79	Union Chargeability Act 1865	An Act to provide for the better Distribution of the Charge for the Relief of the Poor in Unions.	Section Three from "Provided" to the end of that Section.
28 & 29 Vict. c. 89	Greenwich Hospital Act 1865	An Act to provide for the better Government of Greenwich Hospital, and the more beneficial Application of the Revenues thereof.	Sections Four and Fourteen. Section Fifteen to "this Act". Section Thirty-three from "(inclusive)" to "this Act)". Section Thirty-four. The Schedule.
28 & 29 Vict. c. 90	Metropolitan Fire Brigade Act 1865	An Act for the Establishment of a Fire Brigade within the Metropolis.	Section Thirteen from "the First of such" to the end of that Section. Section Fifteen from "on the Thirtieth" to "Sixty-six, and" and the word "succeeding". Section Thirty-four.
28 & 29 Vict. c. 95	Sugar Duties and Drawbacks Act 1865	An Act to amend the Law relating to the Duties on Sugar, and the Drawbacks on those Duties.	The whole act.
28 & 29 Vict. c. 96	Revenue (No. 2) Act 1865	An Act to amend the Laws relating to the Inland Revenue.	Section Twenty-four.
28 & 29 Vict. c. 98	Warehousing of British Compounded Spirits Act 1865	An Act to allow British Compounded Spirits to be warehoused upon Drawback.	Section Fourteen.
28 & 29 Vict. c. 99	County Courts Act 1865	An Act to confer on the County Courts a limited Jurisdiction in Equity.	Section Thirteen from "Provided also" to the end of that Section. Section Twenty-three.
28 & 29 Vict. c. 104	Crown Suits, &c. Act 1865	An Act to amend the Procedure and Practice in Crown Suits in the Court of Exchequer at Westminster; and for other Purposes.	Section Four from "General Rules" to the end of that Section. Sections Twenty-nine, Thirty-three, Forty-five, and Fifty-three. The Third Schedule.
28 & 29 Vict. c. 105	Poor Law Board Continuance Act 1865	An Act to continue the Poor Law Board for a limited Period.	The whole act.
28 & 29 Vict. c. 107	Annual Turnpike Acts Continuance Act 1865	An Act to continue certain Turnpike Acts in Great Britain.	Section One. The Schedule.
28 & 29 Vict. c. 118	Peace Preservation (Ireland) Continuance Act 1865	An Act to continue and amend the Peace Preservation (Ireland) Act, 1856.	Section Three.
28 & 29 Vict. c. 119	Expiring Laws Continuance Act 1865	An Act for continuing various expiring Acts.	The whole act.
28 & 29 Vict. c. 121	Salmon Fishery Act 1865	An Act to amend "The Salmon Fishery Act, 1861".	Sections Forty-three to Forty-six, Forty-eight, Fifty to Fifty-two, Fifty-four, and Fifty-five. The Second Schedule.
28 & 29 Vict. c. 122	Clerical Subscription Act 1865	An Act to amend the Law as to the Subscriptions and Declarations to be made and Oaths to be taken by the Clergy of the Established Church of England and Ireland.	Section Four from "according to the Form" to the end of that Section. Section Fifteen. The Schedule.
28 & 29 Vict. c. 123	Appropriation Act 1865	An Act to apply a Sum out of the Consolidated Fund and the Surplus of Ways and Means to the Service of the Year ending Thirty-first March One thousand eight hundred and sixty-six, and to appropriate the Supplies granted in this Session of Parliament.	The whole act.
28 & 29 Vict. c. 126	Prison Act 1865	An Act to consolidate and amend the Law relating to Prisons.	Section Thirty-five from "1st. That this" to "sixty-six". Section Sixty-nine. Section Seventy-four, Sub-section Three.
29 & 30 Vict. c. 1	Habeas Corpus Suspension (Ireland) Act 1866	An Act to empower the Lord Lieutenant or other Chief Governor or Governors of Ireland to apprehend, and detain for a limited Time, such Persons as he or they shall suspect of conspiring against Her Majesty's Person and Government.	The whole act.
29 & 30 Vict. c. 6	Supply Act 1866	An Act to apply the Sum of One million one hundred and thirty-seven thousand seven hundred and seventy-two Pounds out of the Consolidated Fund to the Service of the Year ending the Thirty-first Day of March One thousand eight hundred and sixty-six.	The whole act.
29 & 30 Vict. c. 9	Mutiny Act 1866	An Act for punishing Mutiny and Desertion, and for the better Payment of the Army and their Quarters.	The whole act.
29 & 30 Vict. c. 10	Marine Mutiny Act 1866	An Act for the Regulation of Her Majesty's Royal Marine Forces while on shore.	The whole act.
29 & 30 Vict. c. 11	National Debt Reduction Act 1866	An Act for the Cancellation of certain Capital Stocks of Annuities standing in the Names of the Commissioners for the Reduction of the National Debt.	Sections Four and Five.
29 & 30 Vict. c. 13	Consolidated Fund Act (19,000,000l.)	An Act to apply the Sum of Nineteen Millions out of the Consolidated Fund to the Service of the Year One thousand eight hundred and sixty-six.	The whole act.
29 & 30 Vict. c. 16	Art Act 1866	An Act for facilitating the public Exhibition of Works of Art in certain Exhibitions.	The whole act.
29 & 30 Vict. c. 19	Parliamentary Oaths Act 1866	An Act to amend the Law relating to Parliamentary Oaths.	Section One, as to the Form of Oath thereby prescribed. Section Six. The Schedule.
29 & 30 Vict. c. 20	Forsyth's Indemnity Act 1866	An Act to indemnify William Forsyth, Esquire, Standing Counsel to the Secretary of State in Council of India.	The whole act.
29 & 30 Vict. c. 25	Exchequer Bills and Bonds Act 1866	An Act to consolidate and amend the several Laws regulating the Issue, and Payment of Exchequer Bills and Bonds.	Section Three from "Provided also" to the end of that Section.
29 & 30 Vict. c. 35	Contagious Diseases Act 1866	An Act for the better Prevention of Contagious Diseases at certain Naval and Military Stations.	Section Three. Sections Six and Seven, the words "on the Commencement of this Act".
29 & 30 Vict. c. 36	Revenue Act 1866	An Act to grant, alter, and repeal certain Duties of Customs and Inland Revenue, and for other Purposes.	Section One so far as it relates to Schedules (B.) and (C.) and from "shall respectively" to "the same". Section Two from "or as regards" to "provided)" and from "Provided always" to the end of that Section. Sections Three to Seven. Schedule (A.) from "the Duties of Customs now charged" to "Tea . . . the lb. 0 0 6". Schedule (C.).
29 & 30 Vict. c. 37	Hop (Prevention of Frauds) Act 1866	An Act to amend an Act of the Fifty-fourth Year of King George the Third, Chapter One hundred and twenty-three, to prevent Frauds and Abuses in the Trade of Hops.	Section Twenty-one.
29 & 30 Vict. c. 41	Nuisances Removal Act (No. 1) 1866	An Act to amend the Nuisances Removal and Diseases Prevention Act, 1860.	Section One.
29 & 30 Vict. c. 46	Belfast Constabulary Act 1866	An Act to authorize the Town Council of Belfast to levy and pay Charges in respect of extra Constabulary.	Sections One and Two.
29 & 30 Vict. c. 60	Militia Pay Act 1866	An Act to defray the Charge of the Pay and authorise the Employment of the Non-commissioned Officers.	The whole act.
29 & 30 Vict. c. 62	Crown Lands Act 1866	An Act to amend the Law relating to the Woods, Forests, and Land Revenues of the Crown.	Section Four.
29 & 30 Vict. c. 64	Inland Revenue Act 1866	An Act to amend the Laws relating to the Inland Revenue.	Section Five to "hereby repealed; and". Sections Twelve and Fourteen.
29 & 30 Vict. c. 82	Standards of Weights, Measures, and Coinage Act 1866	An Act to amend the Acts relating to the Standard Weights and Measures and to the Standard Trial Pieces of the Coin of the Realm.	Section Fourteen. The Schedule.
29 & 30 Vict. c. 88	Oyster Beds (Ireland) Act 1866	An Act to validate certain Licences granted in Ireland for the Establishment of Oyster Beds.	Sections Three and Six.
29 & 30 Vict. c. 90	Sanitary Act 1866	An Act to amend the Law relating to the Public Health.	Section Fifty-seven, Sub-section Three. Section Sixty-one, Sub-section Five. Section Sixty-nine. The Second Schedule.
29 & 30 Vict. c. 91	Appropriation Act 1866	An Act to apply a Sum out of the Consolidated Fund and the Surplus of Ways and Means to the Service of the Year ending Thirty-first March One thousand eight hundred and sixty-seven, and to appropriate the Supplies granted in this Session of Parliament.	The whole act.
29 & 30 Vict. c. 95	Railway Companies (Ireland) Temporary Advances Act 1866	An Act to enable the Public Works Loan Commissioners to make temporary Advances to Railway Companies in Ireland.	Section Four, Sub-section Three from "at a Time" to "Date of the Advance", and Sub-section Four.
29 & 30 Vict. c. 97	Oyster Fishery (Ireland) Amendment Act 1866	An Act further to promote the Cultivation of Oysters in Ireland, and to amend the Acts for that Purpose.	Section Four.
29 & 30 Vict. c. 99	Landed Estates Court Act 1866	An Act to reduce the Number of Judges in the Landed Estates Court in Ireland, and to reduce the Duties payable under the Record of Title and Land Debentures Acts.	Section Four from "and so much" to the end of that Section.
29 & 30 Vict. c. 100	Prisons Act 186	An Act for the Amendment of the Laws relating to Prisons.	Section One, the words "have been or" and from "have previously" to "incurred by". Section Three to "passing of this Act until the Time of the Payment thereof".
29 & 30 Vict. c. 101	Common Law Courts (Fees and Salaries) Act 1866	An Act to make further Provision respecting the Fees payable in the Superior Courts of Law at Westminster, and in the Offices belonging thereto, and respecting the Salaries of certain Officers of those Courts.	Section One. Sections Two, Three, and Four, the words "from and after the said Day". Section Five from "to commence" to "sixty-six, and". Section Six.
29 & 30 Vict. c. 102	Expiring Laws Continuance Act 1866	An Act to continue various expiring Acts.	The whole act.
29 & 30 Vict. c. 103	Constabulary (Ireland) Act 1866	An Act to amend an Act to consolidate the Laws relating to the Constabulary Force in Ireland.	Section Two, Paragraphs Six to Ten, Twelve, and Fifteen, and from "Provided always" to the end of that Section. Sections Three to Five. Section Ten from "and also" to the end of that Section. Section Thirteen.
29 & 30 Vict. c. 104	New Zealand Loans Act 1866	An Act to guarantee the Liquidation of Bonds issued for the Repayment of Advances made out of Public Funds for the Service of the Colony of New Zealand.	Section Four. Repealed as to all Her Majesty's Dominions.
29 & 30 Vict. c. 105	Annual Turnpike Acts Continuance Act 1866	An Act to continue certain Turnpike Acts in Great Britain, and to make further Provision concerning Turnpike Roads.	Section One. The Schedule.
29 & 30 Vict. c. 108	Railway Companies Securities Act 1866	An Act to amend the Law relating to Securities issued by Railway Companies.	Section Four from "and the First" to "sixty-six" and the words "(including the First)".
29 & 30 Vict. c. 109	Naval Discipline Act 1866	An Act to make Provision for the Discipline of the Navy.	Section Ninety-nine. Repealed as to all Her Majesty's Dominions.
29 & 30 Vict. c. 111	Ecclesiastical Commissioners Act 1866	An Act to further amend the Acts relating to the Ecclesiastical Commissioners for England.	Section Sixteen from "Provided, that if" to "sixty-five". Section Seventeen from "so much" to "in lieu thereof". Section Twenty-one.
29 & 30 Vict. c. 112	Evidence (Scotland) Act 1866	An Act to make Provision in regard to the Mode of taking Evidence in Civil Causes in the Court of Session in Scotland.	Section Three, the words "or of the Lords Ordinary".
29 & 30 Vict. c. 117	Reformatory Schools Act 1866	An Act to consolidate and amend the Acts relating to Reformatory Schools in Great Britain.	Section Thirty-seven. Section Thirty-eight from "and to all" to "or any of them", the words "and such Offenders had been sent thither" and from "with this Qualification" to the end of that Section.
29 & 30 Vict. c. 118	Industrial Schools Act 1866	An Act to consolidate and amend the Acts relating to Industrial Schools in Great Britain.	Section Three. Section Fifty-four from "and to all" to the end of that Section. The Schedule. (Note: The Statute Law Revision Act 1878 (41 & 42 Vict. c. 79) substituted "The Schedule" with "The First Schedule".)
29 & 30 Vict. c. 119	Habeas Corpus Suspension (Ireland) Act 1866	An Act to continue the Act of the Twenty-ninth Year [conspiring against Her Majesty's Person and Government].	The whole act.
30 & 31 Vict. c. 1	Habeas Corpus Suspension (Ireland) Act 1867	An Act to further continue the Act [conspiring against Her Majesty's Person and Government].	The whole act.
30 & 31 Vict. c. 4	Consolidated Fund (£369,118 5s. 6d.) Act	An Act to apply the Sum of Three hundred [One thousand eight hundred and sixty-seven].	The whole act.
30 & 31 Vict. c. 5	Dog Licences Act 1867	An Act to repeal the Duties of Assessed Taxes on Dogs, and to impose in lieu thereof a Duty of Excise.	Sections One and Two. Section Three to "Taxes".
30 & 31 Vict. c. 6	Metropolitan Poor Act 1867	An Act for the Establishment in the Metropolis of Asylums for the Sick, Insane, and other Classes of the Poor, and of Dispensaries; and for the Distribution over the Metropolis of Portions of the Charge for Poor Relief; and for other Purposes relating to Poor Relief in the Metropolis.	Sections Sixty and Seventy-eight.
30 & 31 Vict. c. 7	Consolidated Fund (£7,924,000) Act	An Act to apply the Sum of Seven million nine hundred and twenty-four thousand Pounds out of the Consolidated Fund to the Service of the Year ending the Thirty-first Day of March One thousand eight hundred and sixty-eight.	The whole act.
30 & 31 Vict. c. 8	Trades Union Commission Act 1867	An Act for facilitating in certain Cases the Proceedings of the Commissioners appointed to make Inquiry respecting Trades Unions and other Associations of Employers or Workmen.	The whole act.
30 & 31 Vict. c. 10	Sugar Duties Act 1867	An Act to amend the Law relating to the Duties and Drawbacks on Sugar.	The whole act.
30 & 31 Vict. c. 11	Recovery of Alimony (Ireland) Act 1867	An Act to facilitate the Recovery of Arrears of Alimony in certain Cases under Process and Orders of the Matrimonial and Divorce Courts in Ireland.	The whole act.
30 & 31 Vict. c. 13	Mutiny Act 1867	An Act for punishing Mutiny and Desertion, and for the better Payment of the Army and their Quarters.	The whole act.
30 & 31 Vict. c. 14	Marine Mutiny Act 1867	An Act for the Regulation of Her Majesty's Royal Marine Forces while on shore.	The whole act.
30 & 31 Vict. c. 15	Shipping Dues Exemption Act 1867	An Act for the Abolition of certain Exemptions from Local Dues on Shipping and on Goods carried in Ships.	Section Six.
30 & 31 Vict. c. 23	Customs and Inland Revenue Act 1867	An Act to grant and alter certain Duties of Customs and Inland Revenue, and for other Purposes relating thereto.	Section One, so far as it relates to Schedules (A.), (C.), and (D.), and from "and the said Duties" to "passing of this Act". Section Two, the words "Customs Duties and" from "and relating" to "sixty-seven". Section Three. Section Nine from "2nd. Any Policy" to the end of that Section. Section Seventeen. Schedules (A.), (C.), and (D.).
30 & 31 Vict. c. 25	Habeas Corpus Suspension (Ireland) Act 1867	An Act to further continue the Act [conspiring against Her Majesty's Person and Government].	The whole act.
30 & 31 Vict. c. 27	Warehoused British Spirits Act 1867	An Act to allow Warehoused British Spirits to be bottled for Home Consumption.	Section Six.
30 & 31 Vict. c. 30	Consolidated Fund (£14,000,000) Act	An Act to apply the Sum of Fourteen million Pounds out of the Consolidated Fund to the Service of the Year ending the Thirty-first Day of March One thousand eight hundred and sixty-eight.	The whole act.
30 & 31 Vict. c. 31	Exchequer Bonds Act 1867	An Act for raising the Sum of One million seven hundred thousand Pounds by Exchequer Bonds for the Service of the Year ending the Thirty-first day of March One thousand eight hundred and sixty-eight.	The whole act.
30 & 31 Vict. c. 34	Army Enlistment Act 1867	An Act for limiting the Period of Enlistment in Her Majesty's Army.	Sections One and Three. Section Eight from "and the Provisions" to the end of that Section. So much of Section Nine and the Schedule as relates to attestation. Section Ten to "Provided always, that". And, except as to soldiers enlisted before the 9th day of August 1870, Sections Two, Four, and Six, Section Seven to "awarded against him", and the residue of Sections Nine, Ten, and the Schedule.
30 & 31 Vict. c. 44	Chancery (Ireland) Act 1867	An Act to amend the Constitution, Practice, and Procedure of the Court of Chancery in Ireland.	Section Ten. Section Twenty-seven from "but reserving" to the end of that Section. Section Twenty-eight, the words "save in the temporary Manor herein-after provided". Section Twenty-nine. Section Thirty from "except" to "reference, and"; also from "Provided always," to the end of that Section, so far as that part the Section relates to masters in ordinary. Sections Forty-two, Forty-four, Forty-eight, and Fifty-two. Section One hundred and ninety-one, the words "as well as the Income of all Suitors Fee or other Funds." Section One hundred and ninety-five from "save" to the end of that Section. Schedule (A.).
30 & 31 Vict. c. 47	Lis Pendens Act 1867	An Act to amend the Companies Act, 1862 [Satisfaction on Crown Debts and on Judgments].	Section One.
30 & 31 Vict. c. 52	Herring Fisheries (Scotland) Act 1867	An Act to alter and amend the Acts relating to the British White Herring Fishery.	Sections Nine, Ten, and Nineteen.
30 & 31 Vict. c. 55	Lunatics (Scotland) Act 1867	An Act to enlarge for the present Year the Time within which certain Certificates regarding Lunatics in Scotland may be granted.	The whole act.
30 & 31 Vict. c. 68	Common Law Chambers Act 1867	An Act to provide for the better Despatch of Business in the Chambers of the Judges of the Superior Courts of Common Law.	Section Five.
30 & 31 Vict. c. 74	Trades Union Commission Act Extension Act 1867	An Act to extend the "Trades Union Commission Act, 1867."	The whole act.
30 & 31 Vict. c. 80	Valuation of Lands (Scotland) Amendment Act 1867	An Act to define the Duties of the Assessor of Railways in Scotland in making up the Valuation Roll of Railways, and to amend in certain respects the Valuation of Lands (Scotland) Acts.	Section Eleven and Twelve.
30 & 31 Vict. c. 82	Customs Amendment Act 1867	An Act to alter certain Duties and to amend the Laws relating to the Customs.	Section Six from "Provided always," to "Foreign Goods". Section Twenty-seven. The Schedule.
30 & 31 Vict. c. 84	Vaccination Act 1867	An Act to consolidate and amend the Laws relating to Vaccination.	Section Thirty-six.
30 & 31 Vict. c. 85	Galashiels Act 1867	An Act to include the whole of the Burgh of Galashiels within the County, Sheriffdom, and Commissariat of Selkirk.	Section Three.
30 & 31 Vict. c. 87	Court of Chancery (Officers) Act 1867	An Act to facilitate the Transaction of Business in the Chambers of the Judges of the High Court of Chancery, and in the Offices of the Registrars and Accountant General of the said Court, and in Lunacy.	Section Two, the words "and to the Funds out of which such Salaries are to be paid". Section Three. Section Nine from "Fund standing" to "or the other", from "and also, so long," to "One hundred Pounds", and from "by the end of the Fifth" to "eighty-seven." Section Ten from "Provided that" to the end of that Section.
30 & 31 Vict. c. 89	Stamp Duty Composition (Ireland) Act 1867	An Act to render perpetual an Act passed in the Session holden in the Twenty-sixth and Twenty-eighth Years of Her present Majesty, intituled An Act to permit for a limited Period Compositions for Stamp Duty on Bank Post Bills of Five Pounds and upwards in Ireland.	Section One from "and the said" to the end of that Section.
30 & 31 Vict. c. 90	Revenue Act 1867	An Act to alter certain Duties and to amend the Laws relating to the Inland Revenue.	Section Six from "Provided" to the end of that Section. Section Seven. Section Nine from "a Licence" to "Chocolate, or". Section Ten, the words "Coffee, Tea, Cocoa-nuts, Chocolate," (wherever they occur). Sections Eleven and Thirteen. Schedule (A.).
30 & 31 Vict. c. 92	Militia Pay Act 1867	An Act to defray the Charge of the Pay and authorise the Employment of the Non-commissioned Officers.	The whole act.
30 & 31 Vict. c. 102	Representation of the People Act 1867	An Act to further amend the Laws relating to the Representation of the People in England and Wales.	Section Seven, the First and Second Provisos. Section Eight. Section Nineteen from "and, until otherwise" to "said Schedule (B)", except so far as that part of the Section relates to the Hartlepools. Section Twenty from "notwithstanding" to "present Parliament". Section Twenty-one from "until" to "Parliament". Section Twenty-three from "and until" to "Schedule", so far as that part of the Section relates to East Somerset, Mid Somerset, and the Northern Division and Mid Division of the West Riding of Yorkshire; also from "notwithstanding" to "present Parliament". Section Thirty-three, so far as relates to North Devonshire, North-east Essex, the West Kent Division of West Kent, South Lincolnshire, and the Northern Division and Mid Division of the West Riding of Yorkshire. Section Thirty-eight from "and the Register" to the end of that Section. Section Forty-five, so far as it provides that the form of declaration prescribed by the 24 & 25 Vict. c. 53. shall apply to elections of members for the University of London. Sections Forty-eight and Fifty-four. Section Fifty-five from "in the Case of a Parish" to the end of that Section. Section Sixty. Schedule A. so far as it relates to the boroughs of Honiton, Thetford, and Wells. Schedule B., the word "Temporary" in the heading to column 3, and the rest of that column, except so far as relates to the Hartlepools. Schedule D., the word "temporarily" in the heading to column 3, and the rest of that column so far as relates to East Somerset, Mid Somerset, and the Northern Division and Mid Division of the West Riding of Yorkshire. The word "temporarily" in the heading to column 4, and the rest of that column so far as relates to North Devonshire, North-east Essex, the West Kent Division of West Kent, South Lincolnshire, and the Northern Division and Mid Division of the West Riding of Yorkshire.
30 & 31 Vict. c. 103	Factory Acts Extension Act 1867	An Act to extend the Factory Acts.	The temporary modifications in the Schedule.
30 & 31 Vict. c. 106	Poor Law Amendment Act 1867	An Act to make the Poor Law Board permanent, and to provide sundry Amendments in the Laws for the Relief of the Poor.	Sections One and Sixteen.
30 & 31 Vict. c. 110	Reserve Force Act 1867	An Act to consolidate and amend the Acts for regulating the Service of the Chelsea and Naval Out-Pensioners and Pensioners of the East India Company, and for establishing a Reserve Force of Men who have been in Her Majesty's Service.	Section Twenty from "and any Offence" to the end of that Section.
30 & 31 Vict. c. 114	Court of Admiralty (Ireland) Act 1867	An Act to extend the Jurisdiction, alter and amend the Procedure and Practice, and to regulate the Establishment of the Court of Admiralty in Ireland.	Sections Four, Five, Eight, Twenty-six, and One hundred and twenty.
30 & 31 Vict. c. 117	Industrial and Provident Societies Act 1867	An Act to amend the Industrial and Provident Societies Acts.	Sections One and Ten.
30 & 31 Vict. c. 120	Appropriation Act 1867	An Act to apply a Sum out of the Consolidated Fund and the Surplus of Ways and Means to the Service of the Year ending the Thirty-first Day of March One thousand eight hundred and sixty-eight, and to appropriate the Supplies granted in this Session of Parliament.	The whole act.
30 & 31 Vict. c. 121	Annual Turnpike Acts Continuance Act 1867	An Act to continue certain Turnpike Acts in Great Britain, to repeal certain other Turnpike Acts, and to make further Provisions concerning Turnpike Roads.	Section One. The Schedules.
30 & 31 Vict. c. 122	Courts of Law Fees Act 1867	An Act for the Application of Surplus Fees paid by Suitors in the Superior Courts of Law and other Courts towards the Expenses of providing the intended Courts of Justice; and for other Purposes.	Sections Seven and Twelve.
30 & 31 Vict. c. 124	Merchant Shipping Act 1867	An Act to amend the Merchant Shipping Act, 1854.	Sections Two and Three.
30 & 31 Vict. c. 127	Railway Companies Act 1867	An Act to amend the Law relating to Railway Companies.	Section Thirty-seven.
30 & 31 Vict. c. 129	Chancery and Common Law Offices (Ireland) Act 1867	An Act to alter and regulate the Official Establishment of the High Court of Chancery and of the Superior Courts of Common Law in Ireland.	Section Eight from "John Reilly" to "abolished, and", from "and if there" to "Place or Places", and from "1,500l." to "to the end of that Section". Section Twenty-six from "and the Office" to "abolished". Section Forty from "and any Instrument" to the end of that Section. Section Fifty-one from "Provided always" to the end of that Section. Section Fifty-two from "and the Clerk" to the end of that Section. Schedule H., the names "J. Reilly, Esq., 1,500l., M.J. Barry, Esq., 800l."
30 & 31 Vict. c. 134	Metropolitan Streets Act 1867	An Act for regulating the Traffic in the Metropolis, and for making Provision for the greater Security of Persons passing through the Streets.	Section Seventeen, Regulation One. Sections Twenty-one and Twenty-nine.
30 & 31 Vict. c. 138	Railway Companies (Ireland) Temporary Advances Act 1867	An Act to authorize the Extension of the Period for Repayment of Advances made under the Railway Companies (Ireland) Temporary Advances Act, 1866.	The whole act.
30 & 31 Vict. c. 141	Master and Servant Act 1867	An Act to amend the Statute Law as between Master and Servant.	Section Three from "but any Proceedings" to the end of that Section.
30 & 31 Vict. c. 142	County Courts Act 1867	An Act to amend the Law relating to the Jurisdiction of the County Courts.	Sections Six, Thirty-three, and Thirty-six. Schedule (C.).
30 & 31 Vict. c. 143	Expiring Laws Continuance Act 1867	An Act to continue various expiring Laws.	The whole act.
30 & 31 Vict. c. 146	Workshop Regulation Act 1867	An Act for regulating the Hours of Labour for Children, Young Persons, and Women employed in Workshops; and for other Purposes relating thereto.	The temporary exceptions in the Schedule.
31 & 32 Vict. c. 1	Consolidated Fund (£2,000,000) Act 1867	An Act to apply the Sum of Two million Pounds out of the Consolidated Fund to the Service of the Year ending the Thirty-first Day of March One thousand eight hundred and sixty-eight.	The whole act.
31 & 32 Vict. c. 2	Income Tax Act 1867	An Act to grant to Her Majesty additional Income Tax.	The whole act.
31 & 32 Vict. c. 4	Sales of Reversions Act 1867	An Act to amend the Law relating to Sales of Reversions.	Section Three from "and shall not" to the end of that Section.
31 & 32 Vict. c. 5	Metropolitan Streets Act Amendment Act 1867	An Act for the Amendment of "The Metropolitan Streets Act, 1867".	Section One from "and no Part" to the end of that Section. Section Two.
31 & 32 Vict. c. 6	Totnes, &c., Writs Act	An Act to prevent the Issue of Writs for Members to serve in this present Parliament for the Boroughs of Totness, Reigate, Great Yarmouth, and Lancaster.	The whole act.
31 & 32 Vict. c. 7	Habeas Corpus (Ireland) Act 1868	An Act to further continue the Act [conspiring against Her Majesty's Person and Government].	The whole act.
31 & 32 Vict. c. 10	Consolidated Fund (£362,398 19s. 9d.) Act	An Act to apply the Sum of [One thousand eight hundred and sixty-eight].	The whole act.
31 & 32 Vict. c. 13	Consolidated Fund (£6,000,000) Act	An Act to apply the Sum of Six million Pounds out of the Consolidated Fund to the Service of the Year ending on the Thirty-first Day of March One thousand eight hundred and sixty-nine.	The whole act.
31 & 32 Vict. c. 14	Mutiny Act 1868	An Act for punishing Mutiny and Desertion, and for the better Payment of the Army and their Quarters.	The whole act.
31 & 32 Vict. c. 15	Marine Mutiny Act 1868	An Act for the Regulation of Her Majesty's Royal Marine Forces while on shore.	The whole act.
31 & 32 Vict. c. 16	Consolidated Fund (£17,000,000) Act	An Act to apply the Sum of Seventeen million Pounds out of the Consolidated Fund to the Service of the Year ending on the Thirty-first Day of March One thousand eight hundred and sixty-nine.	The whole act.
31 & 32 Vict. c. 18	Railways (Extension of Time) Act 1868	An Act to give further Time for making certain Railways.	The whole act.
31 & 32 Vict. c. 27	Exchequer Bonds Act 1868	An Act for raising the Sum of One million six thousand Pounds by Exchequer Bonds for the Service of the Year ending on the Thirty-first Day of March One thousand eight hundred and sixty-nine.	The whole act.
31 & 32 Vict. c. 28	Revenue Act 1868	An Act to grant certain Duties of Customs and Income Tax.	Except Section Five.
31 & 32 Vict. c. 30	United Parishes (Scotland) Act 1868	An Act to amend the Act of the Seventh and Eighth Years of the Reign of Victoria, Chapter Forty-four, relating to the Formation of quoad sacra Parishes in Scotland, and to repeal the Act of the Twenty-ninth and Thirtieth Years of the Reign of Victoria, Chapter Seventy-seven.	Section One.
31 & 32 Vict. c. 38	Indian Prize Money Act 1868	An Act for the Appropriation of certain unclaimed Shares of Prize Money acquired by Soldiers and Seamen in India.	Section Two to "Six calendar Months next after the passing of this Act; and".
31 & 32 Vict. c. 46	Boundary Act 1868	An Act to settle and describe the Limits of certain Boroughs and the Divisions of certain Counties in England and Wales, in so far as respects the Election of Members to serve in Parliament.	Sections Thirteen and Fourteen.
31 & 32 Vict. c. 48	Representation of the People (Scotland) Act 1868	An Act for the Amendment of the Representation of the People in Scotland.	Section Twelve from "notwithstanding" to "present Parliament". Section Twenty from "and the Provision" to the end of that Section. Section Thirty to "Payment; and". Section Thirty-one from "Provided always" to the end of that Section. Section Fifty-two. Section Fifty-three from "in the case of a County" to the end of that Section.
31 & 32 Vict. c. 49	Representation of the People (Ireland) Act 1868	An Act to amend the Representation of the People in Ireland.	Section Fifteen. Section Nineteen to "repealed; and". Section Twenty.
31 & 32 Vict. c. 50	Lanark Prisons Act 1868	An Act to amend the Acts for the Administration of Prisons in Scotland in so far as regards the County of Lanark; and for other Purposes.	Sections Six and Eight.
31 & 32 Vict. c. 55	Courts of Law Fees (Scotland) Act 1868	An Act to provide for the Collection by means of Stamps of Fees payable in the Supreme and Inferior Courts of Law in Scotland, and in the Offices belonging thereto; and for other Purposes relating thereto.	Section Ten.
31 & 32 Vict. c. 58	Parliamentary Electors Registration Act 1868	An Act to amend the Law of Registration so far as relates to the Year One thousand eight hundred and sixty-eight, and for other Purposes relating thereto.	Section Three from "except" to the end of that Section.
31 & 32 Vict. c. 59	Irish Reformatory Schools Act 1868	An Act to amend the Law relating to Reformatory Schools in Ireland.	Section Thirty-two. Section Thirty-three from "and to all Offenders" to "repealed", from "and such" to "thereto", and from "with this" to the end of that Section.
31 & 32 Vict. c. 63	Bank of Bombay Failure Commissioners Act 1868	Repealed as to all Her Majesty's Dominions.	
31 & 32 Vict. c. 64	Land Registers (Scotland) Act 1868	An Act to improve the System of Registration of Writs relating to Heritable Property in Scotland.	Section Four. Schedule A., No. 1. and Note.
31 & 32 Vict. c. 67	Police Rate Act 1868	An Act to amend the Law relating to the Funds provided for defraying the Expenses of the Metropolitan Police.	Section Four to "repealed; and".
31 & 32 Vict. c. 72	Promissory Oaths Act 1868	An Act to amend the Law relating to Promissory Oaths.	Section Six from "and such" to the end of that Section. Section Fourteen, Sub-section seven, from "with this" to the end of that Sub-section. Section Sixteen.
31 & 32 Vict. c. 73	Revenue Officers' Disabilities Act 1868	An Act to relieve certain Officers employed in the Collection and Management of Her Majesty's Revenues from any legal Disability to vote at the Election of Members to serve in Parliament.	The whole act.
31 & 32 Vict. c. 76	Militia Pay Act 1868	An Act to defray the Charge of the Pay and authorise the Employment of the Non-commissioned Officers.	The whole act.
31 & 32 Vict. c. 77	Divorce Amendment Act 1868	An Act to amend the Law relating to Appeals from the Court of Divorce and Matrimonial Causes in England.	Section Two. Section Six from "provided nevertheless" to the end of that Section.
31 & 32 Vict. c. 82	County General Assessment (Scotland) Act 1868	An Act to abolish the Power of levying the Assessment known as "Rogue Money," and in lieu thereof to confer on the Commissioners of Supply of Counties in Scotland the Power of levying a "County General Assessment".	Section Two from "Provided" to the end of that Section.
31 & 32 Vict. c. 85	Appropriation Act 1868	An Act to apply a Sum out of the Consolidated Fund and the Surplus of Ways and Means to the Service of the Year ending the Thirty-first Day of March One thousand eight hundred and sixty-nine, and to appropriate the Supplies granted in this Session of Parliament.	The whole act.
31 & 32 Vict. c. 94	Railway Companies (Ireland) Temporary Advances Act 1868	An Act to extend further the Extension of the Period for Repayment of Advances made under the Railway Companies (Ireland) Temporary Advances Act, 1866.	The whole act.
31 & 32 Vict. c. 95	Justiciary Court (Scotland) Act 1868	An Act to amend the Procedure in the Court of Justiciary and other Criminal Courts in Scotland.	Sections Twenty and Twenty-nine.
31 & 32 Vict. c. 96	Ecclesiastical Buildings and Glebes (Scotland) Act 1868	An Act to amend the Procedure in regard to Ecclesiastical Buildings and Glebes in Scotland.	Section Twenty-five.
31 & 32 Vict. c. 97	Lunatic Asylums (Ireland) Accounts Audit Act 1868	An Act to make Provision for the Audit of Accounts of District Lunatic Asylums in Ireland.	Sections Two and Three. Section Five from "after" to "Act". Section Six to "Act".
31 & 32 Vict. c. 99	Annual Turnpike Acts Continuance Act 1868	An Act to continue certain Turnpike Acts in Great Britain, to repeal certain other Turnpike Acts, and to make further Provision concerning Turnpike Roads.	Sections One to Five and Eight. The Schedules.
31 & 32 Vict. c. 100	Court of Session Act 1868	An Act to amend the Procedure in the Court of Session, and the Judicial Arrangements in the Superior Courts of Scotland, and to make certain Changes in the other Courts thereof.	Sections Eighty, One hundred and four, and One hundred and seven.
31 & 32 Vict. c. 101	Titles to Land Consolidation (Scotland) Act 1868	An Act to consolidate the Statutes relating to the Constitution and Completion of Titles to Heritable Property in Scotland, and to make certain Changes in the Law of Scotland relating to Heritable Rights.	Section Fifty-two, the words "and Clerk of the Presenter of Signatures in Exchequer" (wherever they occur), and the word "both". Section Ninety-two. Section Ninety-six, the words "or of the Presenter of Signatures", "or to the Presenter of Signatures, as the Case may be", and "or from the Presenter of Signatures, as the Case may be".
31 & 32 Vict. c. 102	General Police and Improvement (Scotland) Act 1862 Amendment Act	An Act to alter the Qualification of the Electors in Places in Scotland under the "General Police and Improvement (Scotland) Act, 1862," or under the Act Thirteen and Fourteen Victoria, Chapter Thirty-three, and to amend the said Acts in certain other respects.	Section Eight.
31 & 32 Vict. c. 108	Municipal Elections Amendment (Scotland) Act 1868	An Act to amend the Laws for the Election of the Magistrates and Councils of Royal and Parliamentary Burghs in Scotland.	Sections Seven and Eighteen.
31 & 32 Vict. c. 109	Compulsory Church Rate Abolition Act 1868	An Act for the Abolition of compulsory Church Rates.	Section Four.
31 & 32 Vict. c. 110	Telegraph Act 1868	An Act to enable Her Majesty's Postmaster General to acquire, work, and maintain Electric Telegraphs.	Section Twenty-four.
31 & 32 Vict. c. 111	Expiring Laws Continuance Act 1868	An Act to continue various expiring Laws.	The whole act.
31 & 32 Vict. c. 117	Incumbents Act 1868	An Act to amend the District Church Tithes Act, 1865, and to secure Uniformity of Designation amongst Incumbents in certain Cases.	Section One.
31 & 32 Vict. c. 119	Regulation of Railways Act 1868	An Act to amend the Law relating to Railways.	Section Thirty-seven from "and the Provisions" to the end of that Section. Sections Forty-six and Forty-seven. The Second Schedule.
31 & 32 Vict. c. 120	West Indies (Salaries) Act 1868	An Act to relieve the Consolidated Fund from the Charge of the Salaries of future Bishops, Archdeacons, Ministers, and other Persons in the West Indies.	Section One from "and all the Powers" to "repealed". Repealed as to all Her Majesty's Dominions.
31 & 32 Vict. c. 123	Salmon Fisheries (Scotland) Act 1868	An Act to amend the Law relating to Salmon Fisheries in Scotland.	Sections Sixteen, Forty-two, and Forty-three.
31 & 32 Vict. c. 125	Parliamentary Elections Act 1868	An Act for amending the Laws relating to Election Petitions, and providing more effectually for the Prevention of corrupt Practices at Parliamentary Elections.	Section Fifty from "but until" to the end of that Section. Section Forty-four from "Provided" to the end of that Section.
31 & 32 Vict. c. 128	Ionian Islands Commissioners Act 1868	An Act to extend the Provisions of the Act Twenty-eighth and Twenty-ninth Victoria, Chapter One hundred and thirteen, to Persons who have held the Office of Lord High Commissioner of the Ionian Islands.	The whole Act, except as to any Pension heretofore granted.

== See also ==
- Halsbury's Statutes
- Statute Law Revision Act
