= Poor Relief Act =

Stock short title used for UK legislation

Poor Relief Act (with its variations) is a stock short title used in the United Kingdom for legislation relating to poor relief.

== List ==
- The Poor Relief Act 1601 (43 Eliz. 1. c. 2)
- The Poor Relief Act 1662 (14 Cha. 2. c. 12)
- The Poor Relief Act 1691 (3 Will. & Mar. c. 11)

The Poor Relief (Ireland) Acts 1838 to 1892 is the collective title of the following Acts:

- The Poor Relief (Ireland) Act 1838 (1 & 2 Vict. c. 56)
- The Poor Relief (Ireland) Act 1839 (2 & 3 Vict. c. 1)
- The Poor Relief (Ireland) Act 1843 (6 & 7 Vict. c. 92)
- The Poor Relief (Ireland) Act 1847 (10 & 11 Vict. c. 31)
- The Poor Relief (Ireland) (No. 2) Act 1847 (10 & 11 Vict. c. 90)
- The Poor Relief (Ireland) Act 1848 (11 & 12 Vict. c. 25)
- The Guardians (Ireland) Act 1849 (12 & 13 Vict. c. 4)
- The Poor Relief (Ireland) Act 1849 (12 & 13 Vict. c. 104)
- The Poor Relief (Ireland) Act 1851 (14 & 15 Vict. c. 68)
- The Poor Relief (Ireland) Act 1862 (25 & 26 Vict. c. 83)
- The Poor Persons Burial (Ireland) Act 1866 (29 & 30 Vict. c. 38)
- The Poor Law Inspectors (Ireland) Act 1868 (31 & 32 Vict. c. 74)
- The Poor Relief (Ireland) Act 1869 (32 & 33 Vict. c. 54)
- The Pauper Children (Ireland) Act 1876 (39 & 40 Vict. c. 38)
- The Poor Law Rating (Ireland) Act 1876 (39 & 40 Vict. c. 50)
- The Poor Afflicted Person Relief (Ireland) Act 1878 (41 & 42 Vict. c. 60)
- Sections 1 and 9 of the Poor Law Act 1889 (52 & 53 Vict. c. 56)
- The Poor Law Acts (Ireland) Amendment Act 1890 (53 & 54 Vict. c. 30)
- The Poor Law (Ireland) Act 1892 (55 & 56 Vict. c. 5)
- The Boards of Management of Poor Law District Schools (Ireland) Act 1892 (55 & 56 Vict. c. 41)

== See also ==
- List of short titles
