= Church of Ireland Acts Repeal Act 1851 =

Act of the Parliament of the United Kingdom

Church of Ireland Acts Repeal Act 1851 (Note: The citation of this act by this short title was authorised by section 1 of, and the first schedule to, the Short Titles Act 1896. Due to the repeal of those provisions it is now authorised by section 19(2) of the Interpretation Act 1978.)
- Act of Parliament
- Parliament of the United Kingdom
- Long title: An Act to repeal certain Statutes relating to the Irish Branch of the United Church of England and Ireland.
- Citation: 14 & 15 Vict. c. 71
- Territorial extent: United Kingdom

Dates
- Royal assent: 7 August 1851
- Commencement: 7 August 1851 (Note: Section 1.)
- Repealed: 11 August 1875

Other legislation
- Amends: See § Repealed enactments
- Repeals/revokes: See § Repealed enactments
- Repealed by: Statute Law Revision Act 1875
- Relates to: Church of Ireland Act 1851; Glebe (Ireland) Act 1851

Status: Repealed

Text of statute as originally enacted

The Church of Ireland Acts Repeal Act 1851 (14 & 15 Vict. c. 71) was an act of the Parliament of the United Kingdom that repealed enactments relating to the Irish Branch of the United Church of England and Ireland, in order that they might be consolidated and amended.

== Provisions ==
=== Repealed enactments ===
Section 1 of the act repealed 41 enactments, listed in that section.

Citation	Short title	Description	Extent of repeal
10 & 11 Chas. 1. c. 2 (I)	Impropriations and Tythes Restitution Act 1634	An Act passed in Session of the Parliament of Ireland holden in the Tenth and Eleventh Years of the Reign of King Charles the First, Chapter Two	As relate to the Restitution of Impropriation and Tithes, and other Rights Ecclesiastical, to the Clergy, and the Presentation to Churches to which such Rights shall have been restore.
15 Chas. 1 Sess. 2. c. 11 (I)	Glebe Lands Act 1639	An Act passed in the Parliament of Ireland in the Fifteenth Year of the Reign of King Charles the First, Chapter Eleven, and entitled “An Act for endowing of Churches with Glebe Lands".	The whole act.
10 Will. 3. c. 6 (I)	Glebe Act 1698	An Act to encourage building of Houses and making other Improvements on Glebe Lands, and to prevent Dilapidations.	So much as relates to the building, improving, and purchasing Houses and Conveniences for Ecclesiastical Persons, and Charges in respect thereof, and to Dilapidations, and the Alienation of Glebe Lands.
2 Anne c. 10 (I)	Glebe Exchange Act 1704	An Act passed in the said Parliament of Ireland in the Second Year of the Reign of Queen Anne, Chapter Ten, and entitled "An Act for the Exchangeof Glebe belonging to Churches in this Kingdom”.	The whole act.
2 Geo. 1. c. 14 (I)	Parish Union and Division Act 1715	An Act passed in the said Parliament, of Ireland in the Second Year of the Reign of King George the First, Chapter Fourteen, and entitled “An Act for the real Union and Division of Parishes".	As relate to the Endowment by Ecclesiastical Persons, of Vicarages and Curacies of Parishes appropriate to their Dignities and Preferment.
6 Geo. 1. c. 13 (I)	Maintenance of Curates Act 1719	An Act passed in the said Parliament of Ireland in the Sixth Year of the Reign of King George the First, Chapter Thirteen, and entitled “An Act for the better. Maintenance of Curates within the Church of Ireland".	As relate to the Erection and Repairs of Chapels of Ease in extensive Parishes.
8 Geo. 1. c. 11 (I)	Glebe Exchange Act 1721	An Act passed in the said Parliament of Ireland in the Eighth Year of the Reign of King George the First, Chapter Eleven, and entitled "An Act for supplying Defect in an Act passed in the Second Year of the Reign of Her late Majesty Queen Anne, entitled ‘An Act for the Exchange of Glebes belonging to Churches in this Kingdom'"	The whole act.
8 Geo. 1. c. 12 (I)	Clergy Residence and Protestant Schools Act 1721	An Act passed in the said Parliament of Ireland in the Eighth Year of the Reign of King George the First, Chapter Twelve, and entitled "An Act for the better enabling of the Clergy having Cure of Souls to reside upon their respective Benefices, and for the Encouragement of Protestant Schools within this Kingdom of Ireland".	Except so far as the same relates to the Encouragement of Protestant Schools in Ireland.
10 Geo. 1. c. 6 (I)	Parish Union and Division Amendment Act 1723	An Act passed in the said Parliament of Ireland in the Tenth Year of the Reign of King George the First, Chapter Six, and entitled "An Act for explaining and amending an Act entitled 'An Act for real Union and Division of Parishes,’ and for confirming an Exchange made of Piece of Ground whereon the Parish Church and Vicarage House of: the Parish of Saint Anne in the Suburbs of the City of Dublin was by former Act of Parliament directed to he built for another Piece of Ground, and for appropriating such other Piece of Ground to the same Uses”.	As relate to the Endowment of Vicarages and Curacies the Churches whereof are appropriate.
12 Geo. 1. c. 10 (I)	Glebe Act 1725	An Act passed in the said Parliament of Ireland in the Twelfth Year of the Reign of King George the First, Chapter Ten, and entitled "An Act to amend and explain an Act entitled ‘An Act to encourage building of Houses, and making other Improvements on Church Lands, and to prevent Dilapidations'".	As relate to the building and improving of Ecclesiastical Residences, and Charges in respect thereof, and Dilapidations thereon, and the Purchase of additional Demesne and Mensal Lands.
1 Geo. 2. c. 15 (I)	Clergy Residence and Protestant Schools Amendment Act 1727	An Act passed in the said Parliament of Ireland in the First Year of the Reign of King George the Second, Chapter Fifteen, and entitled "An Act for rendering more effectual an Act entitled ‘An Act for the better enabling of the Clergy having Cure of Souls to reside upon their respective Benefices, and for the Encouragement of Protestant Schools within this Kingdom of Ireland'”.	As relate to the endowing Churches and Curacies with Glebe Lands, and of reserving Rents thereout, and the building of Residences by Ecclesiastical Person.
1 Geo. 2. c. 18 (I)	Ecclesiastical Benefices and Woods Act 1727	An Act passed in the said Parliament of Ireland in the Virst Year of the Reign of King George the Second, Chapter Eighteen, and entitled An Act to enable Archbishops, Bishops, and other Ecclesiastical Persons and Corporations to grant their Patronage or Rights of Presentation or Nomination to small Livings to such Persons as shall augment the same, and also to enable Archbishops and Bishops and other Ecclesiastical Persons therein mentioned to make Agreements with their Tenants for the inclosing and improving their Woods."	As relate to the Grant of the Patronage of small Livings to Parties endowing same, and the augmenting of same, and the Erection of Chapels of Ease.
1 Geo. 2. c. 22 (I)	Maintenance of Curates Amendment Act 1727	An Act passed in the said Parliament of Ireland in the First Year of the Reign of King George the First, Chapter Twenty-two, and entitled "An Act for explaining and amending an Act entitled ‘An Act for the better Maintenance of Curates within the Church of Ireland'".	As relate to Chapels of Ease erected in Parishes and Cities and Corporate Town.
3 Geo. 2. c. 12 (I)	Clergy Residence and Protestant Schools Amendment Act 1729	An Act passed in the said Parliament of Ireland in the Third Year of the Reign of King George the Second, Chapter Twelve, and entitled “An Act for supplying Defect in an Act for rendering more effectual an Act for better enabling the Clergy having Cure of Souls to reside upon their respective Benefices, and for the Encouragement of Protestant Schools within this Kingdom of Ireland".	The whole act.
9 Geo. 2. c. 13 (I)	Glebe Act 1735	An Act passed in the said Parliament of Ireland in the Ninth Year of the Reign of King George the Second, Chapter Thirteen, and entitled An Act for making more effectual an Act to “amend and explain an Act, entitled 'An Act to encourage building of Houses and making other Improvements on Church Lands, and to prevent Dilapidations'".	The whole act.
15 Geo. 2. c. 5 (I)	Ecclesiastical Demesne Lands Act 1741	An Act passed in the said Parliament of Ireland in the Fifteenth Year of the Reign of King George the Second, Chapter Five, and entitled "An Act to enable Archbishops and Bishops to demise Part of their Demesne Lands, and to change the Site of their Mansion Houses".	The whole act.
17 Geo. 2. c. 8 (I)	Truck Act 1743	An Act passed in the said Parliament of Ireland in the Seventeenth Year of the Reign of King George the Second, Chapter Eight, and entitled "An Act for continuing several Statutes now nearly expiring, and for other Purposes therein contained".	As relate to the Repairs of Ecclesiastical Residence.
19 Geo. 2. c. 16 (I)	Ecclesiastical Lands and Churches Act 1745	An Act passed in the said Parliament of Ireland in the Nineteenth Year of the Reign of King George the Second, Chapter Sixteen, and entitled "An Act for amending the Laws relating to Demesne Lands belonging to Archbishops, and in relation to the building of new Parish Churches".	The whole act.
31 Geo. 2. c. 11 (I)	Clergy Residence Act 1757	An Act passed in the said Parliament of Ireland in the Thirty-first.Year of the Reign of King George the Second, Chapter Eleven, and entitled “An Act more effectually to enable the Clergy having Cure of Souls to reside upon their respective Benefices, and to build upon their respective Glebe Lands".	As relate to the building of Glebe Houses, and the Grant of Land to Parishes for Glebe Lands, or for the Purpose of being exchanged for other Lands suitable for Gleb.
7 Geo. 3. c. 9 (I)	Union and Division of Parishes Act 1767	An Act passed in the said Parliament of Ireland in the Seventh Year of the Reign of King George the Third, Chapter Nine, and entitled "An Act for explaining and amending an Act passed in the Second Year of His Majesty King George the First, entitled ‘An Act for the real Union and Division of Parishes, and for other Purposes therein mentioned'”.	As relate to Building Charges, Improvements, and Dilapidations on Ecclesiastical Residence.
11 & 12 Geo. 3. c. 16 (I)	Parochial Chapels (Ireland) Act 1771	Rwo several Acts passed in Session of the Parliament of Ireland holden in the Eleventh and Twelfth Years of the Reign of King George the Third, Chapter Sixteen, and entitled "An Act for erecting Parochial Chapels of Ease in Parishes of large Extent, and making such Chapels and those that are already erected Perpetual Cures, and for making proper Provision for the Maintenance of Perpetual Curates to officiate in the same, and also in like Manner for making appropriate Parishes Perpetual Cures,” and Chapter Seventeen, entitled "An Act for rendering more effectual the several Laws for the better enabling the Clergy having Cure of Souls to reside upon their Benefices, and to build on their respective Glebe Lands, and to prevent Dilapidations, and for the Encouragement of Protestant Schools within this Kingdom of Ireland".	Except so far as the same relate to the said Protestant Schools.
11 & 12 Geo. 3. c. 17 (I)	Clergy Residence and Glebe Lands (Ireland) Act 1771	Rwo several Acts passed in Session of the Parliament of Ireland holden in the Eleventh and Twelfth Years of the Reign of King George the Third, Chapter Sixteen, and entitled "An Act for erecting Parochial Chapels of Ease in Parishes of large Extent, and making such Chapels and those that are already erected Perpetual Cures, and for making proper Provision for the Maintenance of Perpetual Curates to officiate in the same, and also in like Manner for making appropriate Parishes Perpetual Cures,” and Chapter Seventeen, entitled "An Act for rendering more effectual the several Laws for the better enabling the Clergy having Cure of Souls to reside upon their Benefices, and to build on their respective Glebe Lands, and to prevent Dilapidations, and for the Encouragement of Protestant Schools within this Kingdom of Ireland".	Except so far as the same relate to the said Protestant Schools.
13 & 14 Geo. 3. c. 27 (I)	Armagh Chapels Act 1773	An Act passed in Session of the said Parliament of Ireland holden in the Thirteenth and Fourteenth Years of the Reign of King George the Third, Chapter Twenty-seven, and entitled “An Act to amend an Act passed in the Eighth Year of His present Majesty, entitled ‘An Act for erecting new Chapels of Ease in the Parish of Armagh, and making such Chapels and those that are already erected in said Parish Perpetual Cures, and for making proper Provision for the Maintenance of Perpetual Curates to officiate in the same, and for other Purposes'".	The whole act.
15 & 16 Geo. 3. c. 17 (I)	Glebe Lands and Churches Endowment Act 1775	Af an Act passed in Session of the said Parliament of Ireland holden in the Fifteenth and Sixteenth Years of the Reign of King George the Third, Chapter Seventeen, and entitled "An Act to explain and amend the several Statutes now in force in this Kingdom relative to the Exchange of Glebe Lands, and the Endowment of Churches with new Glebe, and to remove some Doubts relating to certain Statutes, and for other Purposes”.	Except so far as same relates to the Cathedral Church of Armagh.
23 & 24 Geo. 3. c. 49 (I)	Endowments of Parishes, Glebe Lands, etc. Act 1783	An Act passed in Session of the said Parliament of Ireland holden in the Twenty-third and Twenty-fourth Years of the Reign of King George the Third, Chapter Forty-nine, and entitled "An Act for making appropriate Parishes belonging to Archbishops and Bishops Perpetual Cures, and the better to enable such Archbishops and Bishops to endow and augment the Endowments of Vicarages and Curacies to them respectively appropriate, and to render more effectual the several Acts now in force to enable the Clergy having the Cure of Souls to reside upon their respective Benefices, and to build upon their respective Glebe Lands".	Except so far as the same relates to the Union of appropriate Parishes, Free Schools, and Churchwardens.
25 Geo. 3. c. 21 (I)	Ecclesiastical Dilapidations Act 1785	An Act passed in the said Parliament of Ireland in the Twenty-fifth Year of the Reign of King George the Third, Chapter Twenty-one, and entitled "An Act to explain and amend the several Acts made in this Kingdom to encourage the building of Houses and making other Improvements on Church Lands, and to prevent Dilapidation".	As relate to the Validity of Certificates granted to Ecclesiastical Persons for Buildings and Improvements.
25 Geo. 3. c. 49 (I)	Ecclesiastical Lands Act 1785	An Act passed in the said Parliament of Ireland in the said Year of the Reign of King George. the Third, Chapter Forty-nine, and entitled "An Act to explain and amend the several Acts made in this Kingdom to encourage the building of Houses and making other Improvements on Church Lands, and for other Purposes".	As relate to the Use of Copper in Ecclesiastical Residences.
29 Geo. 3. c. 27 (I)	Churches and Glebes Act 1789	An Act passed in the said Parliament of Ireland in the Twenty-ninth Year of the Reign of King George the Third, Chapter Twenty-seven, and entitled “An Act for the better providing for the Repairs of Churches and the Residence of the Clergy".	As relate to Glebe Lands.
31 Geo. 3. c. 19 (I)	Ecclesiastical Improvements Act 1791	An Act passed in the said Parliament of Ireland in the Thirty-first Year of the Reign of King George the Third, Chapter Nineteen, and entitled "An Act to amend an Act passed in the Eleventh and Twelfth Years of His present Majesty, entitled 'An Act for rendering more effectual the several Laws for the better enabling the Clergy having Cure of Souls to reside upon their Benefices, and to prevent Dilapidations, and for the Encouragement of Protestant Schools within this Kingdom of Ireland,’ and also to amend an Act passed in the Thirteenth and Fourteenth Years of His present Majesty, entitled ‘An Act to amend an Act passed in the Eighth Year of His present Majesty entitled ‘An Act for erecting new Chapels of Ease in the Parish ‘of Armagh, and making such Chapels of Ease and those that are already erected in said Parishes Perpetual Cures, and for making a proper Provision for the Maintenance of Perpetual Curates to officiate in the same, and for other Purposes'".	The whole act.
40 Geo. 3. c. 82 (I)	Glebe Lands Act 1800	An Act passed in the said Parliament of Ireland in the Fortieth Year of the Reign of King George the Third, Chapter Eighty-two, and entitled "An Act for the further Encouragement of building and improving on Glebe Lands".	Except so far as it relates to the Mansion House of the See of Meath.
43 Geo. 3. c. 108	Gifts for Churches Act 1803	An Act passed in the Parliament of the United Kingdom in the Forty-third Year of the Reign of King George the Third, Chapter One hundred and eight, and entitled "An Act to promote the building, repairing, or otherwise providing of Churches and Chapels, and Houses of Residences of Ministers, and the providing of Churchyards and Glebes".	So far and no further than as the same relates to the Kingdom of Ireland.
51 Geo. 3. c. 115	Gifts for Churches Act 1811	An Act passed in the said Parliament of the United Kingdom in the Fifty-first Year of the Reign of King George the Third, Chapter One hundred and fifteen, and entitled "An Act for amending the Act Forty-third George Third, to promote the building, repairing, or otherwise providing the Churches and Chapels, and of Houses for the Residence of Ministers, and the providing of Churchyards and Glebes".	So far and no further than as the same relates to the Kingdom of Ireland.
54 Geo. 3. c. 117	Church Building (Ireland) Act 1814	An Act passed in the said Parliament of the United Kingdom in the Fifty-fourth Year of the Reign of King George the Third, Chapter One hundred and seventeen, and entitled "An Act to extend, so far as relates to the building of new Churches, an Act of the Parliament of Ireland passed in the Thirty-third Year of the Reign of His late Majesty King George the Second, entitled 'An Act for reviving and amending an Act passed in the Twenty-third Year of His present Majesty's Reign, entitled ‘An Act for amending, continuing, and making more effectual the several Acts now in force in this Kingdom for the more easy Recovery of Tithes and other Ecclesiastical Dues of small Value, and also for the more easy providing Maintenance for Parish Clerks,’ so far only as the same relates to the more easy providing Maintenance for Parish Clerks, and to encourage the building of new Churches'".	The whole act.
55 Geo. 3. c. 147	Glebe Exchange Act 1815	An Act passed in the said Parliament of the United Kingdom in the Fifty-fifth Year of the Reign of King George the Third, Chapter One hundred and forty-seven, and entitled "An Act for enabling Spiritual Persons to exchange the Parsonage or Glebe Houses or Glebe Lands belonging to their Benefices for others of greater Value or more conveniently situated for their Residence and Occupation, and for annexing such Houses and Lands so taken in exchange to such Benefices as Parsonage or Glebe Houses and Glebe Lands, and for purchasing and annexing Lands to become Glebe in certain Cases, and for other Purposes".	So far only and no further than as the same relates to the Kingdom of Ireland.
6 Geo. 4. c. 8	Glebe Exchange Act 1825	An Act passed in the said Parliament of the United Kingdom in the Sixth Year of the Reign of King George the Fourth, Chapter Eight, and entitled “An Act to amend and render more effectual an Act passed in the Fifty-fifth Year of the Reign of His late Majesty for enabling Spiritual Persons to exchange their Parsonage Houses or Glebe Lands, and for other Purposes therein mentioned".	So far only and no further than as the same relates to the Kingdom of Ireland.
7 Geo. 4. c. 66	Clergy Residence Act 1826	An Act passed in the said Parliament of the United Kingdom in the Seventh Year of the Reign of King George the Fourth, Chapter Sixty-six, and entitled "An Act to render more effectual the several Acts now in force to promote the Residence of the parochial Clergy, by making Provision for purchasing Houses and other necessary Buildings for the Use of their Benefices".	So far only and no further than as the same relates to the Kingdom of Ireland.
7 & 8 Geo. 4. c. 43	Union of Parishes (Ireland) Act 1827	An Act passed in Session of the Parliament of the said United Kingdom holden in the Seventh and Eighth Years of the Reign of King George the Fourth, Chapter Forty-three, and intituled "An Act to consolidate and amend the Laws in force in Ireland for Unions and Divisions of Parishes, and for uniting or disappropriating appropriate Parishes or Parts of Parishes, and to make further Provision with respect to the erecting Chapels of Ease and making Perpetual Cures".	As relate to District Churches and Chapels erected from Portions of contiguous Parishes, and Districts annexed to Chapels already erected, and to Monies payable in respect of Buildings and Improvements in Parishes divided.
6 & 7 Will. 4. c. 31	Chapels of Ease (Ireland) Act 1836	An Act passed in Session of the said Parliament of the United Kingdom holden in the Sixth and Seventh Years of the Reign of King William the Fourth, Chapter Thirty-one, and entitled "An Act to amend an Act of His late Majesty King George the Second, for the Encouragement of building of Chapels of Ease in Ireland".	The whole act.
8 & 9 Vict. c. 54	Parishes (Ireland) Act 1845	An Act passed in Session Vict. of the Parliament of the said United Kingdom holden in the Eighth and Ninth Years of the Reign of Queen Victoria, Chapter Fifty-four, and entitled "An Act to amend the Laws in force in Ireland for Unions and Divisions of Parishes, for the Settlement of the Patronage thereof, and the Celebration of Marriages in the same".	As relate to the Apportionment of Charges for Improvements on Glebes in case of Division of Parishes.
11 & 12 Vict. c. 41	Ecclesiastical Unions, etc. (Ireland) Act 1848	An Act passed in Session of the said Parliament of the United Kingdom holden in the Eleventh and Twelfth Years of the Reign of Queen Victoria, Chapter Forty- one, and entitled "An Act to amend the Laws relating to the Ecclesiastical Union and Divisions of Parishes in Ireland".	As relate to District Churches and Chapels erected in Portions of Parishes in different Dioceses, and the Exchange of Glebe Lands of disconnected Parishes.
12 & 13 Vict. c. 99	Chapels of Ease, etc. (Ireland) Act 1849	An Act passed in Session of the said Parliament of the United Kingdom holden in the Twelfth and Thirteenth Years of the Reign of Queen Victoria, Chapter Ninety-nine, and entitled "An Act to encourage Endowment of Chapels of Ease, and facilitate Assignment of pastoral Districts thereto, and to amend an Act of the Eighth Year of Her present Majesty for Marriages in Ireland, and for registering such Marriages”.	Except so far as same relates to Consents given by the Lord Lieutenant, on behalf of Her Majesty, in certain Cases.

== Subsequent developments ==
The whole act was repealed by section 1 of, and the schedule to, the Statute Law Revision Act 1875 (38 & 39 Vict. c. 66), which came into force on 11 August 1875.
