= Church of Ireland Act 1851 =

Act of the Parliament of the United Kingdom

Church of Ireland Act 1851 (Note: The citation of this act by this short title was authorised by section 1 of, and the first schedule to, the Short Titles Act 1896. Due to the repeal of those provisions it is now authorised by section 19(2) of the Interpretation Act 1978.)
- Act of Parliament
- Parliament of the United Kingdom
- Long title: An Act to consolidate and amend the Laws relating to the Erection and Endowment of Churches and Chapels and Perpetual Curacies in Ireland.
- Citation: 14 & 15 Vict. c. 72
- Territorial extent: Ireland (Note: Preamble.)

Dates
- Royal assent: 7 August 1851
- Commencement: 7 August 1851 (Note: The Acts of Parliament (Commencement) Act 1793.)
Other legislation
Relates to	Church of Ireland Acts Repeal Act 1851; Glebe (Ireland) Act 1851

Status: Amended

Text of statute as originally enacted

The Church of Ireland Act 1851 (14 & 15 Vict. c. 72) is an act of the Parliament of the United Kingdom that consolidated and amended the laws relating to the erection and endowment of churches, chapels, and perpetual curacies in Ireland.
