= Lunatic Asylums (Ireland) Act 1851 =

Act of the Parliament of the United Kingdom

- Act of Parliament
- Parliament of the United Kingdom
- Long title: An Act to continue an Act of the Fifth and Sixth Years of Her present Majesty for amending the Law relative to Private Lunatic Asylums in Ireland.
- Citation: 14 & 15 Vict. c. 45
- Territorial extent: United Kingdom

Dates
- Royal assent: 1 August 1851
- Commencement: 1 August 1851 (Note: The Acts of Parliament (Commencement) Act 1793.)
- Repealed: 11 August 1875
Other legislation
Amends	Private Lunatic Asylums (Ireland) Act 1842
Repealed by	Statute Law Revision Act 1875

Status: Repealed

Text of statute as originally enacted

The Lunatic Asylums (Ireland) Act 1851 (14 & 15 Vict. c. 45) was an act of the Parliament of the United Kingdom. The act extended the Private Lunatic Asylums (Ireland) Act 1842 (5 & 6 Vict. c. 123), which would have expired at the end of that session of Parliament, until the end of the session of Parliament underway on 31 July 1855. The act was superseded by the Lunacy (Ireland) Act 1867 (30 & 31 Vict. c. 118) and the Lunatic Asylums (Ireland) Act 1875 (38 & 39 Vict. c. 67).

== Subsequent developments ==
The whole act was repealed by section 1 of, and the schedule to, the Statute Law Revision Act 1875 (38 & 39 Vict. c. 66), which came into force on 11 August 1875.
