= Medical Charities Act 1851 =

Act of the Parliament of the United Kingdom

Poor Relief (Ireland) Act 1851 (Note: The citation of this act by this short title was authorised by section 1 of, and the first schedule to, the Short Titles Act 1896. Due to the repeal of those provisions it is now authorised by section 19(2) of the Interpretation Act 1978.)
- Act of Parliament
- Parliament of the United Kingdom
- Long title: An Act to provide for the better Distribution, Support, and Management of Medical Charities in Ireland; and to amend an Act of the Eleventh Year of Her Majesty to provide for the Execution of the Laws for the Relief of the Poor in Ireland.
- Citation: 14 & 15 Vict. c. 68
- Territorial extent: United Kingdom

Dates
- Royal assent: 7 August 1851
- Commencement: 1 October 1851 (Note: Section 22.)
- Repealed: 1 April 1973 (Note: The Health and Personal Social Services (Northern Ireland) Order 1972 (SI 1972/1265 (N.I. 14)).)
Other legislation
Amends	Poor Relief (Ireland) (No. 2) Act 1847
Amended by	Statute Law Revision Act 1875
Repealed by	Health and Personal Social Services (Northern Ireland) Order 1972

Status: Repealed

Text of statute as originally enacted

The Poor Relief (Ireland) Act 1851 (14 & 15 Vict. c. 68), sometimes called the Medical Charities Act 1851 and commonly called the Medical Charities Act, was an act of the Parliament of the United Kingdom passed in 1851 by the Parliament of the United Kingdom. It granted the Poor Law Commission powers over the dispensary system in Ireland.

== See also ==
- Irish Poor Laws
