= List of acts of the Parliament of the United Kingdom from 1851 =

This is a complete list of acts of the Parliament of the United Kingdom for the year 1851.

Note that the first parliament of the United Kingdom was held in 1801; parliaments between 1707 and 1800 were either parliaments of Great Britain or of Ireland). For acts passed up until 1707, see the list of acts of the Parliament of England and the list of acts of the Parliament of Scotland. For acts passed from 1707 to 1800, see the list of acts of the Parliament of Great Britain. See also the list of acts of the Parliament of Ireland.

For acts of the devolved parliaments and assemblies in the United Kingdom, see the list of acts of the Scottish Parliament, the list of acts of the Northern Ireland Assembly, and the list of acts and measures of Senedd Cymru; see also the list of acts of the Parliament of Northern Ireland.

The number shown after each act's title is its chapter number. Acts passed before 1963 are cited using this number, preceded by the year(s) of the reign during which the relevant parliamentary session was held; thus the Union with Ireland Act 1800 is cited as "39 & 40 Geo. 3 c. 67", meaning the 67th act passed during the session that started in the 39th year of the reign of George III and which finished in the 40th year of that reign. Note that the modern convention is to use Arabic numerals in citations (thus "41 Geo. 3" rather than "41 Geo. III"). Acts of the last session of the Parliament of Great Britain and the first session of the Parliament of the United Kingdom are both cited as "41 Geo. 3".

Some of these acts have a short title. Some of these acts have never had a short title. Some of these acts have a short title given to them by later acts, such as by the Short Titles Act 1896.

== 14 & 15 Vict. ==
The fourth session of the 15th Parliament of the United Kingdom, which met from 4 February 1851 until 8 August 1851.

=== Public general acts ===
| Short title | Citation | Royal assent |
Long title
| Passengers by Sea Act 1851 (repealed) | 14 & 15 Vict. c. 1 | 1 April 1851 |
An Act to amend the Passengers Act, 1849. (Note: Passengers Act 1849 (12 & 13 Vict. c. 33)) (Repealed by Passengers Act 1852 (15 & 16 Vict. c. 44))
| Annual Inclosure Act 1851 | 14 & 15 Vict. c. 2 | 1 April 1851 |
An Act to authorize the Inclosure of certain Lands in pursuance of the Sixth Annual Report of the Inclosure Commissioners.
| Supply Act 1851 (repealed) | 14 & 15 Vict. c. 3 | 1 April 1851 |
An Act to apply the Sum of Eight Millions out of the Consolidated Fund to the Service of the Year One thousand eight hundred and fifty-one. (Repealed by Statute Law Revision Act 1875 (38 & 39 Vict. c. 66))
| Appointment of Vice-Chancellor Act 1851 (repealed) | 14 & 15 Vict. c. 4 | 1 April 1851 |
An Act to enable Her Majesty to appoint a Vice Chancellor in the Room of Sir James Wigram, resigned. (Repealed by Statute Law Revision Act 1875 (38 & 39 Vict. c. 66))
| Marine Mutiny Act 1851 (repealed) | 14 & 15 Vict. c. 5 | 11 April 1851 |
An Act for the Regulation of Her Majesty's Royal Marine Forces while on Shore. (Repealed by Statute Law Revision Act 1875 (38 & 39 Vict. c. 66))
| Mutiny Act 1851 (repealed) | 14 & 15 Vict. c. 6 | 11 April 1851 |
An Act for punishing Mutiny and Desertion, and for the better Payment of the Army and their Quarters. (Repealed by Statute Law Revision Act 1875 (38 & 39 Vict. c. 66))
| Leases for Mills (Ireland) Act 1851 (repealed) | 14 & 15 Vict. c. 7 | 11 April 1851 |
An Act to amend an Act of Parliament of Ireland of the Twenty-fifth Year of King George the Third, (Note: Leases for Corn Mills Act 1785 (25 Geo. 3. c. 62 (I))) for explaining and amending several Laws for the Encouragement of Agriculture, so far as relates to Leases for the Erection of Mills. (Repealed for Northern Ireland by Statute Law Revision Act 1892 (55 & 56 Vict. c. 19) and Repeal of Unnecessary Laws Act (Northern Ireland) 1953 (c. 5 (N.I.)) and for the Republic of Ireland by Land and Conveyancing Law Reform Act 2009 (No. 27))
| Protection of Inventions Act 1851 (repealed) | 14 & 15 Vict. c. 8 | 11 April 1851 |
An Act to extend the Provisions of the Designs Act, 1850, (Note: Copyright of Designs Act 1850 (13 & 14 Vict. c. 104)) and to give Protection from Piracy to Persons exhibiting new Inventions in the Exhibition of the Works of Industry of all Nations in One thousand eight hundred and fifty-one. (Repealed by Statute Law Revision Act 1875 (38 & 39 Vict. c. 66))
| Exchequer Bills Act 1851 (repealed) | 14 & 15 Vict. c. 9 | 20 May 1851 |
An Act for raising the Sum of Seventeen millions seven hundred and fifty-six thousand six hundred Pounds by Exchequer Bills, for the Service of the Year One thousand eight hundred and fifty-one. (Repealed by Statute Law Revision Act 1875 (38 & 39 Vict. c. 66))
| Indemnity Act 1851 (repealed) | 14 & 15 Vict. c. 10 | 20 May 1851 |
An Act to indemnify such Persons in the United Kingdom as have omitted to qualify themselves for Offices and Employments, and to extend the Time limited for those Purposes respectively. (Repealed by Promissory Oaths Act 1871 (34 & 35 Vict. c. 48))
| Poor Law (Apprentices, &c.) Act 1851 (repealed) | 14 & 15 Vict. c. 11 | 20 May 1851 |
An Act for the better Protection of Persons under the Care and Control of others as Apprentices or Servants; and to enable the Guardians and Overseers of the Poor to institute and conduct Prosecutions in certain Cases. (Repealed by Poor Law Act 1927 (17 & 18 Geo. 5. c. 14))
| Income Tax Act 1851 (repealed) | 14 & 15 Vict. c. 12 | 5 June 1851 |
An Act to continue the Duties on Profits arising from Property, Professions, Trades, and Offices, and to amend the Act (Note: Income Tax Act 1842 (5 & 6 Vict. c. 35)) imposing the same. (Repealed for the United Kingdom by Statute Law Revision Act 1875 (38 & 39 Vict. c. 66) and Finance Act 1896 (59 & 60 Vict. c. 28) and for the Republic of Ireland by Statute Law Revision Act 2007 (No. 28))
| Arsenic Act 1851 or the Sale of Arsenic Regulation Act 1851 (repealed) | 14 & 15 Vict. c. 13 | 5 June 1851 |
An Act to regulate the Sale of Arsenic. (Repealed for England and Wales and Scotland by Pharmacy and Poisons Act 1933 (23 & 24 Geo. 5. c. 25) and for Northern Ireland by Medicines, Pharmacy and Poisons Act (Northern Ireland) 1945 (c. 9 (N.I.)))
| Compound Householders Act 1851 (repealed) | 14 & 15 Vict. c. 14 | 3 July 1851 |
An Act to amend the Law for the Registration of certain Persons commonly known as "Compound Householders," and to facilitate the Exercise by such Persons of their Right to vote in the Election of Borough Members to serve in Parliament. (Repealed by Representation of the People Act 1918 (7 & 8 Geo. 5. c. 64))
| Chancery (Ireland) Act 1851 (repealed) | 14 & 15 Vict. c. 15 | 3 July 1851 |
An Act to amend the Court of Chancery (Ireland) Regulation Act, 1850. (Note: Court of Chancery (Ireland) Regulation Act 1850 (13 & 14 Vict. c. 89)) (Repealed by Chancery Appeal Court (Ireland) Act 1856 (19 & 20 Vict. c. 92))
| Highways, South Wales Act 1851 (repealed) | 14 & 15 Vict. c. 16 | 3 July 1851 |
An Act for the better Management and Control of the Highways in South Wales. (Repealed by South Wales Highways Act 1860 (23 & 24 Vict. c. 68))
| Commons Law Courts (Ireland) Act 1851 (repealed) | 14 & 15 Vict. c. 17 | 3 July 1851 |
An Act further to explain and amend an Act (Note: Supreme Court (Ireland) Act 1850 (13 & 14 Vict. c. 18)) for the Regulation of Process and Practice in the Superior Courts of Common Law in Ireland. (Repealed by Statute Law Revision Act 1875 (38 & 39 Vict. c. 66))
| Stamps Act 1851 (repealed) | 14 & 15 Vict. c. 18 | 3 July 1851 |
An Act to continue the Stamp Duties granted by an Act of the Fifth and Sixth Years of Her present Majesty (Note: Stamp Duties (Ireland) Act 1842 (5 & 6 Vict. c. 82)) to assimilate the Stamp Duties in Great Britain and Ireland, and to make Regulations for collecting and managing the same. (Repealed by Statute Law Revision Act 1875 (38 & 39 Vict. c. 66))
| Prevention of Offences Act 1851 (repealed) | 14 & 15 Vict. c. 19 | 3 July 1851 |
An Act for the better Prevention of Offences. (Repealed by Statute Law (Repeals) Act 1989 (c. 43))
| Fee-Farm Rents (Ireland) Act 1851 | 14 & 15 Vict. c. 20 | 3 July 1851 |
An Act to extend the Remedies provided by the Renewable Leasehold Conversion Act, (Note: Renewable Leasehold Conversion Act 1849 (12 & 13 Vict. c. 105)) for the Recovery of Fee-farm Rents under that Act, to all other Fee-farm Rents and to other Rents in Ireland reserved upon Grants of Land in which the Grantors have no Reversion. (Repealed for the Republic of Ireland by Land and Conveyancing Law Reform Act 2009 (No. 27))
| Bridges (Ireland) Act 1851 (repealed) | 14 & 15 Vict. c. 21 | 3 July 1851 |
An Act to amend an Act of the Sixth and Seventh Years of Her Majesty, (Note: Bridges (Ireland) Act 1843 (6 & 7 Vict. c. 42)) to amend an Act of the Nineteenth and Twentieth Years of King George the Third (Note: Bridges Act 1779 (19 & 20 Geo. 3. c. 41 (I))) for empowering Grand Juries in Ireland to present Bridges, and Tolls to be paid for passing the same, in certain Cases. (Repealed for Northern Ireland by Statute Law Revision Act 1875 (38 & 39 Vict. c. 66), Statute Law Revision Act 1892 (55 & 56 Vict. c. 19) and Statute Law Revision Act (Northern Ireland) 1954 (c. 35 (N.I.)) and for the Republic of Ireland by Local Government Act 1946 (No. 24))
| Survey, Great Britain Act 1851 or the Ordnance Survey Act 1851 (repealed) | 14 & 15 Vict. c. 22 | 24 July 1851 |
An Act to continue the Survey of Great Britain, Berwick-upon-Tweed, and the Isle of Man. (Repealed by Statute Law Revision Act 1875 (38 & 39 Vict. c. 66))
| Public Works Loans Act 1851 (repealed) | 14 & 15 Vict. c. 23 | 24 July 1851 |
An Act to authorize for a further Period the Advance of Money out of the Consolidated Fund to a limited Amount for carrying on Public Works and Fisheries and Employment of the Poor. (Repealed by Public Works Loans Act 1875 (38 & 39 Vict. c. 89))
| School Sites Act 1851 (repealed) | 14 & 15 Vict. c. 24 | 24 July 1851 |
An Act to amend the Acts for the granting of Sites for Schools. (Repealed for Scotland by Education (Scotland) Act 1945 (8 & 9 Geo. 6. c. 37) and for the Republic of Ireland by Statute Law Revision Act 2007 (No. 28))
| Landlord and Tenant Act 1851 (repealed) | 14 & 15 Vict. c. 25 | 24 July 1851 |
An Act to improve the Law of Landlord and Tenant in relation to Emblements, to growing Crops seized in Execution, and to Agricultural Tenants Fixtures. (Repealed by Tribunals, Courts and Enforcement Act 2007 (c. 15))
| Herring Fishery Act 1851 (repealed) | 14 & 15 Vict. c. 26 | 24 July 1851 |
An Act to amend the Acts relating to the British White Herring Fishery. (Repealed for the United Kingdom by Statute Law (Repeals) Act 1986 (c. 12) and for the Republic of Ireland by Statute Law Revision Act 2007 (No. 28))
| Prisons (Scotland) Act 1851 (repealed) | 14 & 15 Vict. c. 27 | 24 July 1851 |
An Act to amend certain Acts for the Improvement of Prisons and Prison Discipline in Scotland. (Repealed by Prisons (Scotland) Act 1860 (23 & 24 Vict. c. 105))
| Common Lodging Houses Act 1851 or the Shaftesbury Act (repealed) | 14 & 15 Vict. c. 28 | 24 July 1851 |
An Act for the well-ordering of Common Lodging Houses. (Repealed by Public Health Act 1875 (38 & 39 Vict. c. 55), Statute Law Revision Act 1892 (55 & 56 Vict. c. 19) and Public Health (London) Act 1936 (26 Geo. 5 & 1 Edw. 8. c. 50))
| Ecclesiastical Jurisdiction Act 1851 (repealed) | 14 & 15 Vict. c. 29 | 24 July 1851 |
An Act for further continuing certain temporary Provisions concerning Ecclesiastical Jurisdiction in England. (Repealed by Statute Law Revision Act 1875 (38 & 39 Vict. c. 66))
| Highway Rates Act 1851 (repealed) | 14 & 15 Vict. c. 30 | 24 July 1851 |
An Act to continue an Act (Note: Application of Highway Rates to Turnpikes Act 1841 (4 & 5 Vict. c. 59)) for authorizing the Application of Highway Rates to Turnpike Roads. (Repealed by Statute Law Revision Act 1875 (38 & 39 Vict. c. 66))
| Loan Societies Act 1851 (repealed) | 14 & 15 Vict. c. 31 | 24 July 1851 |
An Act to continue an Act (Note: Loan Societies Act 1840 (3 & 4 Vict. c. 110)) to amend the Laws relating to Loan Societies. (Repealed by Statute Law Revision Act 1875 (38 & 39 Vict. c. 66))
| Militia Ballots Suspension Act 1851 (repealed) | 14 & 15 Vict. c. 32 | 24 July 1851 |
An Act to suspend the making of Lists and the Ballots and Enrolments for the Militia of the United Kingdom. (Repealed by Statute Law Revision Act 1875 (38 & 39 Vict. c. 66))
| Assessed Taxes Act 1851 (repealed) | 14 & 15 Vict. c. 33 | 24 July 1851 |
An Act to enlarge the Period allowed for compounding for Assessed Taxes. (Repealed by Revenue Act 1869 (32 & 33 Vict. c. 14))
| Labouring Classes Lodging Houses Act 1851 or the Shaftesbury Act (repealed) | 14 & 15 Vict. c. 34 | 24 July 1851 |
An Act to encourage the Establishment of Lodging Houses for the Labouring Classes. (Repealed by Housing of the Working Classes Act 1890 (53 & 54 Vict. c. 70))
| Naval Apprentices (Ireland) Act 1851 (repealed) | 14 & 15 Vict. c. 35 | 24 July 1851 |
An Act to extend the Benefits of certain Provisions of the General Merchant Seamen's Act (Note: Merchant Seamen Act 1844 (7 & 8 Vict. c. 112)) relating to Apprentices bound to the Sea Service to Apprentices bound to the Sea Service by Boards of Guardians of the Poor in Ireland, and to enable such Guardians to place out Boys in the Naval Service. (Repealed for Northern Ireland by Merchant Shipping Repeal Act 1854 (17 & 18 Vict. c. 120) and Statute Law Revision Act (Northern Ireland) 1954 (c. 35 (N.I.)) and for the Republic of Ireland by Statute Law Revision Act 1983 (No. 11))
| House Tax Act 1851 (repealed) | 14 & 15 Vict. c. 36 | 24 July 1851 |
An Act to repeal the Duties payable on Dwelling Houses according to the Number of Windows or Lights, and to grant in lieu thereof other Duties on Inhabited Houses according to their annual Value. (Repealed by Finance Act 1924 (14 & 15 Geo. 5. c. 21))
| Annual Turnpike Acts Continuance Act 1851 (repealed) | 14 & 15 Vict. c. 37 | 24 July 1851 |
An Act to continue certain Turnpike Acts in Great Britain. (Repealed by Statute Law Revision Act 1875 (38 & 39 Vict. c. 66))
| Turnpike Trusts (Making of Provisional Orders) Act 1851 (repealed) | 14 & 15 Vict. c. 38 | 24 July 1851 |
An Act to facilitate Arrangements for the Relief of Turnpike Trusts, and to make certain Provisions respecting Exemptions from Tolls. (Repealed by Statute Law Revision Act 1894 (57 & 58 Vict. c. 56))
| Rating of Small Tenements Act 1851 (repealed) | 14 & 15 Vict. c. 39 | 24 July 1851 |
An Act to exempt Burgesses and Freemen in certain Cases from the Operation of an Act (Note: Rating of Small Tenements Act 1850 (13 & 14 Vict.. c. 99)) for the better assessing and collecting the Poor Rates and Highway Rates in respect of Small Tenements. (Repealed by Statute Law Revision Act 1875 (38 & 39 Vict. c. 66))
| Marriages, India Act 1851 (repealed) | 14 & 15 Vict. c. 40 | 24 July 1851 |
An Act for Marriages in India. (Repealed by Statute Law Revision Act 1875 (38 & 39 Vict. c. 66))
| Chief Justice's Salary Act 1851 (repealed) | 14 & 15 Vict. c. 41 | 1 August 1851 |
An Act to regulate the Salaries of the Chief Justice of the Court of Queen's Bench and the Chief Justice of the Court of Common Pleas. (Repealed by Supreme Court of Judicature (Consolidation) Act 1925 (15 & 16 Geo. 5. c. 49))
| Crown Lands Act 1851 | 14 & 15 Vict. c. 42 | 1 August 1851 |
An Act to make better Provision for the Management of the Woods, Forests, and Land Revenues of the Crown, and for the Direction of Public Works and Buildings. (Repealed for the Republic of Ireland by Land and Conveyancing Law Reform Act 2009 (No. 27))
| Hainault Forest Act 1851 or the Hainault Forest Inclosure Act 1851 (repealed) | 14 & 15 Vict. c. 43 | 1 August 1851 |
An Act for disafforesting the forest of Hainault in the county of Essex. (Repealed by Crown Estate Act 1961 (9 & 10 Eliz. 2. c. 55) and Wild Creatures and Forest Laws Act 1971 (c. 47))
| Turnpike Acts Continuance (Ireland) Act 1851 (repealed) | 14 & 15 Vict. c. 44 | 1 August 1851 |
An Act to continue certain Acts for regulating Turnpike Roads in Ireland. (Repealed by Statute Law Revision Act 1875 (38 & 39 Vict. c. 66))
| Lunatic Asylums (Ireland) Act 1851 (repealed) | 14 & 15 Vict. c. 45 | 1 August 1851 |
An Act to continue an Act of the Fifth and Sixth Years of Her present Majesty (Note: Private Lunatic Asylums (Ireland) Act 1842 (5 & 6 Vict. c. 123)) for amending the Law relative to Private Lunatic Asylums in Ireland. (Repealed by Statute Law Revision Act 1875 (38 & 39 Vict. c. 66))
| Crown Lands (Copyholds) Act 1851 (repealed) | 14 & 15 Vict. c. 46 | 1 August 1851 |
An Act to amend Two several Acts (Note: York House and Victoria Park Act 1841 (4 & 5 Vict. c. 27)) (Note: Victoria Park Act 1842 (5 & 6 Vict.. c. 20)) of Her Majesty's Reign enabling the Commissioners of Her Majesty's Woods to purchase Lands for and to form Victoria Park; and to indemnify the Trustees of Copyhold Lands held in trust for Her Majesty. (Repealed by Statute Law Revision Act 1892 (55 & 56 Vict. c. 19), Statute Law Revision Act 1953 (2 & 3 Eliz. 2. c. 5) and Crown Estate Act 1961 (9 & 10 Eliz. 2. c. 55))
| Poor Rates Act 1851 (repealed) | 14 & 15 Vict. c. 47 | 1 August 1851 |
An Act to continue the Exemption of Inhabitants from Liability to be rated as such in respect of Stock in Trade or other Property to the Relief of the Poor. (Repealed by Statute Law Revision Act 1875 (38 & 39 Vict. c. 66))
| Unlawful Oaths (Ireland) Act 1851 or the Unlawful Oaths Continuance Act 1851 or the Unlawful Oaths Act 1851 (repealed) | 14 & 15 Vict. c. 48 | 1 August 1851 |
An Act to continue an Act of the Second and Third Years of Her present Majesty, (Note: Unlawful Societies (Ireland) Act 1839 (2 & 3 Vict. c. 74)) "to extend and render more effectual for Five Years an Act passed in the Fourth Year of His late Majesty George the Fourth, (Note: Unlawful Oaths (Ireland) Act 1823 (4 Geo. 4. c. 87)) to amend an Act passed in the Fiftieth Year of His Majesty George the Third, (Note: Unlawful Oaths (Ireland) Act 1810 (50 Geo. 3. c. 102)) for preventing the administering and taking unlawful Oaths in Ireland," as the same is amended by an Act of the Eleventh and Twelfth Years of Her Majesty's Reign. (Note: Unlawful Combinations (Ireland) Act 1848 (11 & 12 Vict. c. 89)) (Repealed by Statute Law Revision Act 1875 (38 & 39 Vict. c. 66))
| Preliminary Inquiries Act 1851 (repealed) | 14 & 15 Vict. c. 49 | 1 August 1851 |
An Act to repeal an Act of the Eleventh and Twelfth Years of Her present Majesty, (Note: Local Acts (Preliminary Inquiries) Act 1848 (11 & 12 Vict. c. 129)) for making preliminary Inquiries in certain Cases of Applications for Local Acts, and to make other Provisions in lieu thereof. (Repealed by Statute Law Revision Act 1964 (c. 79))
| Tithe Rating Act 1851 or the Tithes Rating Act 1851 (repealed) | 14 & 15 Vict. c. 50 | 1 August 1851 |
An Act to amend the Public Health Act, (Note: Public Health Act 1848 (11 & 12 Vict. c. 63)) and an Act of the Third and Fourth Years of King William the Fourth, (Note: Lighting and Watching Act 1833 (3 & 4 Will. 4. c. 90)) in respect of the Assessment of Tithe and Tithe Rentcharges for certain Rates. (Repealed by Local Government Act 1966 (c. 42))
| Loans for Public Works (Ireland) Act 1851 (repealed) | 14 & 15 Vict. c. 51 | 1 August 1851 |
An Act to authorize for a further Period the Application of Money for the Purposes of Loans for carrying on Public Works in Ireland. (Repealed by Statute Law Revision Act 1875 (38 & 39 Vict. c. 66))
| Absconding Debtors Arrest Act 1851 (repealed) | 14 & 15 Vict. c. 52 | 1 August 1851 |
An Act to facilitate the more speedy Arrest of absconding Debtors. (Repealed by Bankruptcy Repeal and Insolvent Court Act 1869 (32 & 33 Vict. c. 83))
| Inclosure Commissioners Act 1851 (repealed) | 14 & 15 Vict. c. 53 | 1 August 1851 |
An Act to consolidate and continue the Copyhold and Inclosure Commissions, and to provide for the Completion of Proceedings under the Tithe Commutation Acts. (Repealed by Statute Law (Repeals) Act 1998 (c. 43))
| Second Annual Inclosure Act 1851 | 14 & 15 Vict. c. 54 | 1 August 1851 |
An Act to authorize the Inclosure of certain Lands in pursuance of a Special Report of the Inclosure Commissioners.
| Criminal Justice Administration Act 1851 | 14 & 15 Vict. c. 55 | 1 August 1851 |
An Act to amend the Law relating to the Expences of Prosecutions, and to make further Provision for the Apprehension and Trial of Offenders, in certain Cases.
| Charities (Service of Notice) Act 1851 (repealed) | 14 & 15 Vict. c. 56 | 1 August 1851 |
An Act to sanction the Service by Post of Notices relative to the Proceedings of certain charitable Institutions, and to make further Provision as to the Service of such Notices in future. (Repealed by Charities Act 1960 (8 & 9 Eliz. 2. c. 58))
| Civil Bill Courts (Ireland) Act 1851 (repealed) | 14 & 15 Vict. c. 57 | 1 August 1851 |
An Act to consolidate and amend the Laws relating to Civil Bills and the Courts of Quarter Sessions in Ireland. (Repealed by County Courts Act (Northern Ireland) 1955 (c. 21 (N.I.)), County Courts Act (Northern Ireland) 1959 (c. 25 (N.I.)) and County Court Appeals Act (Northern Ireland) 1964 (c. 3 (N.I.)))
| Militia Pay Act 1851 (repealed) | 14 & 15 Vict. c. 58 | 1 August 1851 |
An Act to defray the Charge of the Pay, Clothing, and contingent and other Expenses of the Disembodied Militia in Great Britain and Ireland; to grant Allowances in certain Cases to Subaltern Officers, Adjutants, Paymasters, Quartermasters, Surgeons, Assistant Surgeons, Surgeons Mates, and Serjeant Majors of the Militia; and to authorize the Employment of the Non-commissioned Officers. (Repealed by Statute Law Revision Act 1875 (38 & 39 Vict. c. 66))
| Soap Duties Allowances Act 1851 (repealed) | 14 & 15 Vict. c. 59 | 1 August 1851 |
An Act to continue certain of the Allowances of the Duty of Excise on Soap used in Manufactures. (Repealed by Statute Law Revision Act 1875 (38 & 39 Vict. c. 66))
| Ecclesiastical Titles Act 1851 (repealed) | 14 & 15 Vict. c. 60 | 1 August 1851 |
An Act to prevent the Assumption of certain Ecclesiastical Titles in respect of Places in the United Kingdom. (Repealed by Ecclesiastical Titles Act 1871 (34 & 35 Vict. c. 53))
| Metropolitan Market Act 1851 or the Smithfield Market Removal Act 1851 (repealed) | 14 & 15 Vict. c. 61 | 1 August 1851 |
An Act for providing a Metropolitan Market and Conveniences connected therewith in lieu of the Cattle Market at Smithfield. (Repealed by Metropolitan Market Act 1857 (20 & 21 Vict. c. cxxxv))
| Customs Act 1851 (repealed) | 14 & 15 Vict. c. 62 | 7 August 1851 |
An Act to alter certain Duties of Customs, and to enable the Treasury to regulate the Mode of keeping the Account between the Receiver General of Customs and the Bank of England. (Repealed by Customs Consolidation Act 1853 (16 & 17 Vict. c. 107))
| New Brunswick Boundary Act 1851 (repealed) | 14 & 15 Vict. c. 63 | 7 August 1851 |
An Act for the Settlement of the Boundaries between the Provinces of Canada and New Brunswick. (Repealed by Statute Law Revision Act 1959 (7 & 8 Eliz. 2. c. 68))
| Railway Regulation Act 1851 (repealed) | 14 & 15 Vict. c. 64 | 7 August 1851 |
An Act to repeal the Act (Note: Railways Commissioners Act 1846 (9 & 10 Vict. c. 105)) for constituting Commissioners of Railways. (Repealed for England and Wales and Scotland by Transport Act 1962 (c. 46) and for Northern Ireland by Road Traffic, Transport and Roads (Northern Ireland) Order 1984 (SI 1984/1986 (N.I. 15)))
| Grand Jury Cess (Dublin) Act 1851 (repealed) | 14 & 15 Vict. c. 65 | 7 August 1851 |
An Act to continue certain temporary Provisions relating to the Collection of Grand Jury Cess in Ireland; and also to provide for the due Annexation of an isolated District, formerly of the County of Dublin, to a Barony of the County of Wicklow, for the Purposes of Grand Jury Cess and other Purposes. (Repealed by Local Government (Ireland) Act 1898 (61 & 62 Vict. c. 37))
| Highland Roads and Bridges Act 1851 (repealed) | 14 & 15 Vict. c. 66 | 7 August 1851 |
An Act for rebuilding the Bridge over the River Ness at the Town of Inverness, and improving the Approaches thereto; and for amending the Acts relating to Highland Roads and Bridges. (Repealed by Statute Law Revision Act 1892 (55 & 56 Vict. c. 19))
| Gunpowder in Mersey Act 1851 (repealed) | 14 & 15 Vict. c. 67 | 7 August 1851 |
An Act to repeal so much of an Act of the Twelfth Year of King George the Third, (Note: Gunpowder Act 1772 (12 Geo. 3. c. 61)) relating to the making, keeping, and Carriage of Gunpowder, as exempts therefrom certain Gunpowder Magazines and Stores near Liverpool, and to make certain temporary Provisions with regard to the said Magazines and Stores. (Repealed by Statute Law (Repeals) Act 1977 (c. 18))
| Poor Relief (Ireland) Act 1851 or the Medical Charities Act 1851 (repealed) | 14 & 15 Vict. c. 68 | 7 August 1851 |
An Act to provide for the better Distribution, Support, and Management of Medical Charities in Ireland; and to amend an Act of the Eleventh Year of Her Majesty (Note: Poor Relief (Ireland) (No. 2) Act 1847 (10 & 11 Vict. c. 90)) to provide for the Execution of the Laws for the Relief of the Poor in Ireland. (Repealed for Northern Ireland by Health and Personal Social Services (Northern Ireland) Order 1972 (SI 1972/1265 (N.I. 14)) and for the Republic of Ireland by Public Assistance Act 1939 (No. 27))
| Sheep, etc., Diseases Act 1851 (repealed) | 14 & 15 Vict. c. 69 | 7 August 1851 |
An Act to continue an Act of the Twelfth Year of Her present Majesty, (Note: Contagious Disorders (Sheep), etc. Act 1848 (11 & 12 Vict. c. 107)) to prevent the spreading of contagious or infectious Disorders among Sheep, Cattle, and other Animals. (Repealed by Statute Law Revision Act 1875 (38 & 39 Vict. c. 66))
| Railways Act (Ireland) 1851 or the Railways (Ireland) Act 1851 | 14 & 15 Vict. c. 70 | 7 August 1851 |
An Act to alter and amend certain provisions of the Lands Clauses Consolidation Act, 1845, (Note: Lands Clauses Consolidation Act 1845 (8 & 9 Vict. c. 18)) so far as relates to Ireland.
| Church of Ireland Acts Repeal Act 1851 (repealed) | 14 & 15 Vict. c. 71 | 7 August 1851 |
An Act to repeal certain Statutes relating to the Irish Branch of the United Church of England and Ireland. (Repealed by Statute Law Revision Act 1875 (38 & 39 Vict. c. 66))
| Church of Ireland Act 1851 | 14 & 15 Vict. c. 72 | 7 August 1851 |
An Act to consolidate and amend the Laws relating to the Erection and Endowment of Churches and Chapels and Perpetual Curacies in Ireland.
| Glebe (Ireland) Act 1851 or the Glebe Act 1851 | 14 & 15 Vict. c. 73 | 7 August 1851 |
An Act to consolidate and amend the Laws relating to Ecclesiastical Residences in Ireland.
| Ecclesiastical Property Valuation (Ireland) Act 1851 (repealed) | 14 & 15 Vict. c. 74 | 7 August 1851 |
An Act to amend an Act of the Eleventh and Twelfth Years of Her Majesty, (Note: Tithe Rentcharge (Ireland) Act 1848 (11 & 12 Vict. c. 80)) relating to Poor Rate Poundage and the Valuation of Ecclesiastical Property in Ireland; and to provide for the Renewal of Leases of Lands disappropriated from Bishoprics. (Repealed for the Republic of Ireland by Statute Law Revision Act 2007 (No. 28))
| Metropolitan Sewers Act 1851 (repealed) | 14 & 15 Vict. c. 75 | 7 August 1851 |
An Act to amend and continue the Metropolitan Sewer Acts. (Repealed by Statute Law Revision Act 1875 (38 & 39 Vict. c. 66))
| New Forest Act 1851 (repealed) | 14 & 15 Vict. c. 76 | 7 August 1851 |
An Act to extinguish the Right of the Crown to Deer in the New Forest, and to give Compensation in lieu thereof; and for other Purposes relating to the said Forest. (Repealed by New Forest Deer Removal Act 1853 (16 & 17 Vict. c. 19), Crown Lands Act 1866 (29 & 30 Vict. c. 62), Crown Estate Act 1961 (9 & 10 Eliz. 2. c. 55) and Wild Creatures and Forest Laws Act 1971 (c. 47))
| Battersea Park Act 1851 (repealed) | 14 & 15 Vict. c. 77 | 7 August 1851 |
An Act to alter and extend the Powers of an Act of the Ninth and Tenth Years of Her Majesty's Reign, intituled "An Act to empower the Commissioners of Her Majesties Woods to form a Royal Park in Battersea Fields in the County of Surrey." (Note: Battersea Park Act 1846 (9 & 10 Vict. c. 38)) (Repealed by Statute Law Revision Act 1875 (38 & 39 Vict. c. 66))
| Coalwhippers (Port of London) Act 1851 or the Coalwhippers London Act 1851 (repealed) | 14 & 15 Vict. c. 78 | 7 August 1851 |
An Act to continue and amend an Act for establishing an Office for the Benefit of the Coalwhippers of the Port of London. (Repealed by Statute Law Revision Act 1875 (38 & 39 Vict. c. 66))
| Steam Navigation Act 1851 (repealed) | 14 & 15 Vict. c. 79 | 7 August 1851 |
An Act to consolidate and amend the Laws relating to the Regulation of Steam Navigation, and to the Boats and Lights to be carried by Sea-going Vessels. (Repealed by Merchant Shipping Repeal Act 1854 (17 & 18 Vict. c. 120))
| Public Health Supplemental Act for Great Yarmouth 1851 | 14 & 15 Vict. c. 80 | 7 August 1851 |
An Act for confirming a certain Provisional Order of the General Board of Health for applying the Public Health Act, 1848, to the Borough of Great Yarmouth in the County of Norfolk.
| | Great Yarmouth Order. | |
| Lunatics Removal (India) Act 1851 (repealed) | 14 & 15 Vict. c. 81 | 7 August 1851 |
An Act to authorize the Removal from India of Insane Persons charged with Offences, and to give better Effect to Inquisitions of Lunacy taken in India. (Repealed for the United Kingdom by Statute Law Revision Act 1958 (6 & 7 Eliz. 2. c. 46) and for the Republic of Ireland by Statute Law Revision Act 2007 (No. 28))
| Great Seal Act 1851 (repealed) | 14 & 15 Vict. c. 82 | 7 August 1851 |
An Act to simplify the Forms of Appointments to certain Offices, and the Manner of passing Grants under the Great Seal. (Repealed by Great Seal Act 1884 (47 & 48 Vict. c. 30))
| Court of Chancery Act 1851 (repealed) | 14 & 15 Vict. c. 83 | 7 August 1851 |
An Act to improve the Administration of Justice in the Court of Chancery and in the Judicial Committee of the Privy Council. (Repealed by Statute Law (Repeals) Act 2004 (c. 14))
| Canterbury Association (New Zealand) Act 1851 or the Canterbury Association Act 1851 (repealed) | 14 & 15 Vict. c. 84 | 7 August 1851 |
An Act to alter and amend an Act (Note: Canterbury Association (New Zealand) Act 1850 (13 & 14 Vict. c. 70)) empowering the Canterbury Association to dispose of certain Lands in New Zealand. (Repealed by Statute Law (Repeals) Act 1989 (c. 43))
| Constabulary (Ireland) Act 1851 (repealed) | 14 & 15 Vict. c. 85 | 7 August 1851 |
An Act further to amend an Act of the Sixth Year of King William the Fourth, (Note: Constabulary (Ireland) Act 1836 (6 & 7 Will. 4. c. 13)) to consolidate and amend the Laws relating to the Constabulary Force in Ireland. (Repealed for Northern Ireland by Police Act (Northern Ireland) 1970 (c. 9 (N.I.)) and for the Republic of Ireland by Statute Law Revision Act 1983 (No. 11))
| New Zealand Settlements Act 1851 (repealed) | 14 & 15 Vict. c. 86 | 7 August 1851 |
An Act to regulate the Affairs of certain Settlements established by the New Zealand Company in New Zealand. (Repealed by Statute Law Revision Act 1950 (14 Geo. 6. c. 6))
| Representative Peers (Scotland) Act 1851 (repealed) | 14 & 15 Vict. c. 87 | 7 August 1851 |
An Act to regulate certain Proceedings in relation to the Elections of Representative Peers for Scotland. (Repealed by Peerage Act 1963 (c. 48))
| Solicitors Act 1851 (repealed) | 14 & 15 Vict. c. 88 | 7 August 1851 |
An Act for amending the several Acts for the Regulation of Attornies and Solicitors. (Repealed for Northern Ireland by Solicitors (Northern Ireland) Order 1976 (SI 1976/582 (N.I. 12)) and for the Republic of Ireland by Solicitors Act 1954 (No. 36))
| Metropolitan Interment Act 1851 (repealed) | 14 & 15 Vict. c. 89 | 7 August 1851 |
An Act to amend the Metropolitan Interment Act, 1850, (Note: Mercantile Marine Act 1850 (13 & 14 Vict. c. 93)) and to authorize the Advance of Public Money to a limited Amount for the Purposes of the said Act. (Repealed by Statute Law Revision Act 1861 (24 & 25 Vict. c. 101))
| Fines Act (Ireland) 1851 or the Fines (Ireland) Act 1851 | 14 & 15 Vict. c. 90 | 7 August 1851 |
An Act for the better Collection of Fines, Penalties, Issues, Amerciaments, and forfeited Recognizances in Ireland.
| Emigration from Scotland Act 1851 or the Emigration Advances Act 1851 (repealed) | 14 & 15 Vict. c. 91 | 7 August 1851 |
An Act to authorize the Application of Advances (out of Money now authorized to be advanced for the Improvement of Landed Property) to facilitate Emigration from certain distressed Districts of Scotland. (Repealed by Statute Law Revision Act 1892 (55 & 56 Vict. c. 19))
| Summary Jurisdiction (Ireland) Act 1851 | 14 & 15 Vict. c. 92 | 7 August 1851 |
An Act to consolidate and amend the Acts relating to certain Offences and other Matters as to which Justices of the Peace exercise Summary Jurisdiction in Ireland.
| Petty Sessions (Ireland) Act 1851 or the Petty Sessions Act (Ireland) 1851 | 14 & 15 Vict. c. 93 | 7 August 1851 |
An Act to consolidate and amend the Acts regulating the Proceedings at Petty Sessions, and the Duties of Justices of the Peace out of Quarter Sessions, in Ireland.
| High Peak Mining Customs and Mineral Courts Act 1851 | 14 & 15 Vict. c. 94 | 7 August 1851 |
An Act to define and amend the Mineral Customs of certain Parts of the Hundred of High Peak in the County of Derby, Part of the Possessions of Her Majesty’s Duchy of Lancaster; to make Provision for the better Administration of Justice in the Barmote Courts therein; and to improve the Practice and Proceedings of the said Courts.
| Crown Estate Paving Act 1851 or the Crown Paving Act 1851 | 14 & 15 Vict. c. 95 | 7 August 1851 |
An Act for transferring the Duties of paving, lighting, watering, and cleansing Parts of the Crown Estate in the District of the Regent's Park and certain Streets and Places in Westminster from the Commissioners acting under several Acts of Their late Majesties King George the Fourth and King William the Fourth to the Parishes; and for transferring the Jurisdiction of the said Commissioners over certain other Places in Westminster to the Commissioners of Her Majesty's Works and Public Buildings; and for other Purposes.
| Mercantile Marine Act Amendment Act 1851 (repealed) | 14 & 15 Vict. c. 96 | 7 August 1851 |
An Act to amend the Mercantile Marine Act, 1850. (Repealed by Merchant Shipping Repeal Act 1854 (17 & 18 Vict. c. 120))
| Church Building Act 1851 (repealed) | 14 & 15 Vict. c. 97 | 7 August 1851 |
An Act to amend the Church Building Acts. (Repealed for England and Wales by Statute Law (Repeals) Act 1974 (c. 22) and for the Isle of Man by Isle of Man (Church Building and New Parishes) Act 1897 (60 & 61 Vict. c. 33))
| Public Health Supplemental Act 1851 (No. 2) or the Public Health Supplemental No. 2 Act 1851 | 14 & 15 Vict. c. 98 | 7 August 1851 |
An Act for confirming certain Provisional Orders of the General Board of Health.
| | Morpeth Order. | |
| | Margate Order. | |
| | Bristol Order. | |
| | Borough of Weymouth and Melcombe Regis Order. | |
| | Sherborne Order. | |
| | Newmarket Order. | |
| | Bridgend Order. | |
| | Romford Order. | |
| | Bryn Mawr Order. | |
| | Tenby Order. | |
| | Norwich Order. | |
| | Kingston-upon-Hull Order. | |
| | Gateshead Order. | |
| | Hartlepool Order. | |
| | Hastings Order. | |
| | West Cowes Order. | |
| Evidence Act 1851 | 14 & 15 Vict. c. 99 | 7 August 1851 |
An Act to amend the Law of Evidence.
| Criminal Procedure Act 1851 (repealed) | 14 & 15 Vict. c. 100 | 7 August 1851 |
An Act for further improving the Administration of Criminal Justice. (Repealed by Statute Law (Repeals) Act 1986 (c. 12))
| Appropriation Act 1851 (repealed) | 14 & 15 Vict. c. 101 | 8 August 1851 |
An Act to apply a Sum out of the Consolidated Fund, and certain other Sums, to the Service of the Year One thousand eight hundred and fifty-one; and to appropriate the Supplies granted in this Session of Parliament. (Repealed by Statute Law Revision Act 1875 (38 & 39 Vict. c. 66))
| Seamen's Fund Winding-up Act 1851 (repealed) | 14 & 15 Vict. c. 102 | 8 August 1851 |
An Act to amend the Acts relating to the Merchant Seamen’s Fund, and to provide for winding up the said Fund, and for the better Management thereof in the meantime. (Repealed by Charities Act 1960 (8 & 9 Eliz. 2. c. 58) and Statute Law Revision Act 1963 (c. 30))
| Public Health Supplemental Act 1851 (No. 3) | 14 & 15 Vict. c. 103 | 8 August 1851 |
An Act to confirm certain Provisional Orders of the General Board of Health.
| | Tynemouth Order. | |
| | March Order. | |
| | Ware Order. | |
| | Barnard Castle Order. | |
| | Halifax Order. | |
| | Alfreton Order. | |
| Episcopal and Capitular Estates Act 1851 (repealed) | 14 & 15 Vict. c. 104 | 8 August 1851 |
An Act to facilitate the Management and Improvement of Episcopal and Capitular Estates in England. (Repealed by Statute Law Revision Act 1964 (c. 79))
| Poor Law Amendment Act 1851 (repealed) | 14 & 15 Vict. c. 105 | 8 August 1851 |
An Act to continue an Act of the Fourteenth Year of Her Majesty (Note: Poor Law Amendment Act 1850 (13 & 14 Vict. c. 101)) for charging the Maintenance of certain poor Persons in Unions in England and Wales upon the Common Fund; and to make certain Amendments in the Laws for the Belief of the Poor. (Repealed by Statute Law (Repeals) Act 1971 (c. 52))
| St. Alban's Bribery Commission Act 1851 (repealed) | 14 & 15 Vict. c. 106 | 8 August 1851 |
An Act for appointing Commissioners to inquire into the Existence of Bribery in the Borough of St. Albans. (Repealed by Statute Law Revision Act 1875 (38 & 39 Vict. c. 66))

=== Local acts ===
| Short title | Citation | Royal assent |
Long title
| Pyecombe and Hickstead Turnpike Roads Act 1851 | 14 & 15 Vict. c. i | 20 May 1851 |
An Act for repairing and managing the Roads from the Brighthelmston Road at Pyecombe to Hand Cross, and from Pyecombe to the Henfield Road at Poynings Common, in the County of Sussex.
| Leicester Sewerage Act 1851 | 14 & 15 Vict. c. ii | 20 May 1851 |
An Act for the Improvement of the Sewerage of the Borough of Leicester, and for making other Provisions for the Sanitary Regulation of such Borough.
| Ouseburn Bridge Act 1851 | 14 & 15 Vict. c. iii | 20 May 1851 |
An Act for building a Bridge over Ouseburn, with Approaches thereto, in the Borough and County of Newcastle-upon-Tyne.
| Dewsbury and Batley Gas Act 1851 (repealed) | 14 & 15 Vict. c. iv | 20 May 1851 |
An Act to make the Limits of the Dewsbury Gas Act (Note: Dewsbury Gas Act 1840 (3 & 4 Vict. c. xlii)) commensurate with the whole of the Parish of Dewsbury and the Township of Bailey in the Parish of Bailey; and to authorize the raising of a further Sum of Money. (Repealed by Dewsbury and Batley Gas Act 1861 (24 & 25 Vict. c. xciv))
| Laird's Patent Act 1851 | 14 & 15 Vict. c. v | 20 May 1851 |
An Act for rendering valid certain Letters Patent granted to John Laird of Birkenhead, Shipbuilder.
| Durham Markets Company's Act 1851 | 14 & 15 Vict. c. vi | 20 May 1851 |
An Act for establishing new Markets and Market Places in the City of Durham, for abolishing the Corn Tolls and for regulating the Markets and Fairs within the said City and the Suburbs thereof, and for other Purposes.
| Walworth Common Inclosure Amendment Act 1851 (repealed) | 14 & 15 Vict. c. vii | 20 May 1851 |
An Act for altering and amending The Walworth Common Inclosure Act, 10 Geo. 3. Cap. 72.; (Note: Walworth Common Inclosure Act 1770 (10 Geo. 3. c. 72 Pr.)) for authorizing a Partition of the Walworth Common Estate; for incorporating the Governors and Guardians of the Poor of the Parish of Saint Mary Newington in the County of Surrey, and for enabling such Governors and Guardians to erect a new Workhouse; for altering and amending the Acts 54 Geo. 3. Cap. 113. (Note: St. Mary, Newington, Poor Relief and Workhouse Act 1814 (54 Geo. 3. c. cxiii)) and the 1 Geo. 4. Cap. 41. (Note: St. Mary Newington Parish Churches Act 1820 (1 Geo. 4. c. xli)) relating to the said Parish; and for other Purposes. (Repealed by London Government (Borough of Southwark) Order in Council 1901 (SR&O 1901/275))
| Downham Fen Drainage Act 1851 | 14 & 15 Vict. c. viii | 20 May 1851 |
An Act for amending an Act passed in the Forty-second Year of the Reign of His Majesty King George the Third, (Note: Downham Market, Wimbotsham, Stow Bardolph and Denver Drainage Act 1802 (42 Geo. 3. c. xix)) for draining and improving certain Fen Lands and Low Grounds in the Parishes of Downham Market, Wimbotsham, Stow Bardolph, and Denver, in the County of Norfolk.
| Reading Cemetery Act 1851 (repealed) | 14 & 15 Vict. c. ix | 20 May 1851 |
An Act to confirm the Issue of certain Shares in the Reading Cemetery Company; to enable the Company to raise a further Sum of Money; and for other Purposes. (Repealed by Berkshire Act 1986 (c. ii))
| Manchester Parish Highways Act 1851 | 14 & 15 Vict. c. x | 20 May 1851 |
An Act for Relief to the several Townships, in the Parish of Manchester from the Repair of Highways not situate within such Townships respectively.
| Cheltenham and Painswick Turnpike Road Act 1851 (repealed) | 14 & 15 Vict. c. xi | 20 May 1851 |
An Act to extend and amend the Provisions of the Act (Note: Road from Cheltenham to Prinknash Act 1820 (1 Geo. 4. c. xvi)) relating to the Cheltenham and Painswick District of Turnpike Road in the County of Gloucester, and to create a further Term therein. (Repealed by Statute Law (Repeals) Act 2013 (c. 2))
| Cheltenham and Gloucester Turnpike Road Act 1851 (repealed) | 14 & 15 Vict. c. xii | 20 May 1851 |
An Act to amend and extend the Provisions of the Acts relating to the Cheltenham and Gloucester District of Turnpike Roads in the County of Gloucester, and to create a further Term therein. (Repealed by Statute Law (Repeals) Act 2013 (c. 2))
| Appleby and Kendal Turnpike Road Act 1851 (repealed) | 14 & 15 Vict. c. xiii | 20 May 1851 |
An Act for keeping in repair the Road from Appleby in the County of Westmoreland to Kirkby-in-Kendal, and from Orton to the Turnpike Road near Shap, and from Highgate, near Tebay, through Kirkby Stephen, to Market Brough in the said County. (Repealed by Annual Turnpike Acts Continuance Act 1870 (33 & 34 Vict. c. 73))
| Scarborough Gas Company's Act 1851 (repealed) | 14 & 15 Vict. c. xiv | 20 May 1851 |
An Act for incorporating "The Scarborough Gas Company," for enabling the Company to raise a further Sum of Money for better supplying the Borough of Scarborough with Gas, and for other Purposes. (Repealed by Scarborough Gas (Consolidation) Act 1927 (17 & 18 Geo. 5. c. xcv))
| Woodchurch Turnpike Road Act 1851 | 14 & 15 Vict. c. xv | 20 May 1851 |
An Act to amend and extend the Provisions of an Act (Note: Tenterden and Warehorne, and Bethersden and Appledore Roads Act 1820 (1 Geo. 4. c. xlvi)) for widening and improving the Road leading from the Turnpike Road in the Town of Tenterden, through Woodchurch, to Warehorne, and the Road leading out of the Turnpike Road in the Parish of Bethersden, through Woodchurch, to Appledore in tho County of Kent; and to create a further Term therein.
| Hartlepool Freemen's Lands and Harbour Dues Act 1851 (repealed) | 14 & 15 Vict. c. xvi | 20 May 1851 |
An Act to provide for the Alteration or Extinguishment of the existing Rights in the Freemen's Pastures in the Township and Borough of Hartlepool in the County of Durham, and for the Appropriation and Management of such Pastures; for vesting in the Body Corporate of the Borough the Harbour Dues receivable by them; and for other Purposes. (Repealed by County of Cleveland Act 1987 (c. ix))
| Millthrop and Levens Turnpike Road Act 1851 | 14 & 15 Vict. c. xvii | 20 May 1851 |
An Act to amend an Act passed in the Third Year of the Reign of King George the Fourth, intituled "An Act for more effectually repairing the Roads from Nether Bridge to Levens Bridge, and from thence through the Town of Millthrop to Dixes, and from, the Town of Millthrop to Hangbridge, and from thence to join the Heronsyke Turnpike Road near Clawthrop Hall, in the County of Westmoreland." (Note: Road from Nether Bridge and from Millthrop (Westmorland) Act 1822 (3 Geo. 4. c. xii))
| Mildenhall and Lakenheath Turnpike Roads Act 1851 (repealed) | 14 & 15 Vict. c. xviii | 20 May 1851 |
An Act for more effectually repairing the Road from Beck Fen Lane in the Parish of Mildenhall in the County of Suffolk to Littleport in the Isle of Ely and County of Cambridge, and other Roads therein mentioned in the Counties of Norfolk and Suffolk. (Repealed by Statute Law (Repeals) Act 2008 (c. 12))
| Angerstein Railway Act 1851 | 14 & 15 Vict. c. xix | 20 May 1851 |
An Act to authorize the Construction of a Bridge across the Lower Turnpike Road leading from Greenwich to Woolwich, and the crossing of a Footpath.
| Wiveliscombe Turnpike Roads Act 1851 (repealed) | 14 & 15 Vict. c. xx | 20 May 1851 |
An Act for maintaining in repair several Roads leading from and through the Town of Wiveliscombe in the County of Somerset, and the Roads adjoining thereto in the Counties of Somerset and Devon. (Repealed by Annual Turnpike Acts Continuance Act 1871 (34 & 35 Vict. c. 115))
| Bangor and Caernarvon Railway Act 1851 | 14 & 15 Vict. c. xxi | 20 May 1851 |
An Act for making a Railway from the Chester and Holyhead Railway near Bangor to Port Dinorwic and Caernarvon.
| Bristol and Exeter Railway Act 1851 | 14 & 15 Vict. c. xxii | 20 May 1851 |
An Act to amend some of the Provisions of the Acts relating to the Bristol and Exeter Railway Company, and to grant to such Company certain Powers of holding Shares in other Undertakings.
| Stockton and Darlington Railway Act 1851 (repealed) | 14 & 15 Vict. c. xxiii | 20 May 1851 |
An Act for empowering the Stockton and Darlington Railway Company, and their Lessors, the Wear Valley Railway Company and the Middlesbrough and Redcar Railway Company, to raise more Money; and for other Purposes. (Repealed by Stockton and Darlington Railway Act 1854 (17 & 18 Vict. c. cxxviii))
| Shrewsbury, Wenlock and Bridgnorth Turnpike Roads Act 1851 | 14 & 15 Vict. c. xxiv | 5 June 1851 |
An Act for repairing the Road leading from Shrewsbury to Bridgnorth, and several other Roads therein mentioned.
| Scottish Central Railway Amendment Act 1851 (repealed) | 14 & 15 Vict. c. xxv | 5 June 1851 |
An Act to enable the Scottish Central Railway Company to raise a further Sum of Money. (Repealed by Scottish Central Railway Consolidation Act 1859 (22 & 23 Vict. c. lxxxiii))
| Halesworth, Beccles and Haddiscoe Railway Act 1851 (repealed) | 14 & 15 Vict. c. xxvi | 5 June 1851 |
An Act for making a Railway from Halesworth to Beccles and Haddiscoe, with a Branch therefrom, to be called "The Halesworth, Beccles, and Haddiscoe Railway." (Repealed by East Suffolk Railway Act 1854 (17 & 18 Vict. c. cxix))
| North British Railway (Stations Enlargement) Act 1851 | 14 & 15 Vict. c. xxvii | 5 June 1851 |
An Act for enabling the North British Railway Company to enlarge their Station at Edinburgh, and to make certain short Railways there and at Dalkeith; and for other Purposes.
| London and Blackwall Railway (Branch to Haydon Square) Act 1851 | 14 & 15 Vict. c. xxviii | 5 June 1851 |
An Act for making a Branch Railway from the London and Blackwall Railway to Haydon Square, Whitechapel; and for amending some of the Powers of the Acts relating to the London and Blackwall Railway Company.
| Royal Naval School Amendment Act 1851 (repealed) | 14 & 15 Vict. c. xxix | 5 June 1851 |
An Act for extending the Benefit of the Royal Naval School to Children at present ineligible to be admitted therein, and for authorizing the Establishment of a Chapel in connexion with the said School, and for amending the Acts relating thereto. (Repealed by Statute Law (Repeals) Act 2008 (c. 12))
| London and Blackwall Railway (Extension of Time) Act 1851 | 14 & 15 Vict. c. xxx | 5 June 1851 |
An Act for extending the Time limited for widening the London and Blackwall Railway, and for making the Branches to the London and Saint Katherine Docks; for erecting a Station and other Works at Rhodeswell in the Parish of Saint Anne; and for amending the Acts relating to the said Railway.
| Richmond and Lancaster Western District Turnpike Road Act 1851 (repealed) | 14 & 15 Vict. c. xxxi | 5 June 1851 |
An Act for continuing the Term and amending and extending the Provisions of the Act (Note: Richmond (Yorkshire) and Lancaster Road (Western District) Act 1826 (7 Geo. 4. c. lxxi)) relating to the Western District of the Richmond and Lancaster Turnpike Road. (Repealed by Annual Turnpike Acts Continuance Act 1867 (30 & 31 Vict. c. 121))
| Regent's Canal Reservoir Act 1851 | 14 & 15 Vict. c. xxxii | 5 June 1851 |
An Act to enable the Company of Proprietors of the Regent's Canal to enlarge the Reservoir on the River Brent; and to amend the Acts relating to the Canal.
| Leicester Waterworks Amendment Act 1851 (repealed) | 14 & 15 Vict. c. xxxiii | 5 June 1851 |
An Act to amend "The Leicester Waterworks Act, 1847," (Note: Leicester Waterworks Act 1847 (10 & 11 Vict. c. cclxxxii)) to make certain Alterations in the Works, and to extend the Period for completing such Works; and also to authorize an Arrangement with the Local Board of Health for the Borough of Leicester. (Repealed by Leicestershire Act 1985 (c. xvii))
| Derby, Ashbourne and Hurdloe Turnpike Road Act 1851 | 14 & 15 Vict. c. xxxiv | 5 June 1851 |
An Act for continuing the Term of the Derby, Ashbourne, and Hurdloe Road Act, (Note: Road from Derby to Hurdloe House and Compton Branch Act 1828 (9 Geo. 4. c. lxxix)) and for other Purposes.
| Mayfield Railway Act 1851 | 14 & 15 Vict. c. xxxv | 5 June 1851 |
An Act for the making of a Railway from Mayfield in the County of Sussex to join the Railway from Tunbridge Wells to near Hastings of the South-eastern Railway Company, and to be called "The Mayfield Railway."
| Whitby Waterworks Act 1851 | 14 & 15 Vict. c. xxxvi | 5 June 1851 |
An Act for supplying the Inhabitants of the Town of Whitby and adjacent Places with Water.
| Derby, Duffield, Wirksworth and Sheffield Turnpike Road Act 1851 | 14 & 15 Vict. c. xxxvii | 5 June 1851 |
An Act for repairing and managing the Roads from the North End of the Town of Derby in the County of Derby to Sheffield in the County of York, and from Duffield to Wirksworth in the County of Derby.
| Aberdeen County Records and Public Offices Act 1851 (repealed) | 14 & 15 Vict. c. xxxviii | 5 June 1851 |
An Act for erecting and maintaining new Public Offices for the County of Aberdeen, for altering and enlarging the present Record Office of the County, and for other Purposes. (Repealed by Aberdeen County and Municipal Buildings Act 1866 (29 & 30 Vict. c. civ))
| Malton and Driffield Junction Railway Amendment Act 1851 | 14 & 15 Vict. c. xxxix | 5 June 1851 |
An Act to authorize certain Alterations in the Line and Levels of the Malton and Driffield Junction Railway, and to amend the Act (Note: Malton and Driffield Junction Railway Act 1846 (9 & 10 Vict. c. lxxvii)) relating thereto.
| Hereford, Ross and Gloucester Railway Act 1851 | 14 & 15 Vict. c. xl | 5 June 1851 |
An Act for making a Railway from the Gloucester and Dean Forest Railway in the Parish of Westbury in the County of Gloucester to the City of Hereford.
| Manchester and Ashton-under-Lyne New Road Act 1851 | 14 & 15 Vict. c. xli | 5 June 1851 |
An Act to continue the Term of the Act of the Sixth Year of George the Fourth, Chapter Fifty-one (Local), (Note: Manchester and Ashton-under-Lyne Road Act 1825 (6 Geo. 4. c. li)) so far as relates to the Turnpike Road between Manchester and Audenshaw in the Parish of Ashton-under-Lyne, all in the County Palatine of Lancaster; and to make better Provision for the Repair of the Road; and for other Purposes.
| Harwich Improvement, Quays and Pier Act 1851 | 14 & 15 Vict. c. xlii | 3 July 1851 |
An Act to improve the Town of Harwich, to reclaim Part of the Foreshore of Harwich Harbour, and to construct Quays and a Pier, and for other Purposes.
| Commercial Docks Act 1851 (repealed) | 14 & 15 Vict. c. xliii | 3 July 1851 |
An Act to enable the Commercial Dock Company to purchase and enlarge the East Country Dock; to construct a Tramway to connect their Docks with the Deptford Branch Railway; and for other Purposes. (Repealed by Surrey Commercial Dock Act 1864 (27 & 28 Vict. c. xxxi))
| Killarney and Valencia Railway Act 1851 | 14 & 15 Vict. c. xliv | 3 July 1851 |
An Act to authorize a Deviation in the Line of the Killarney and Valencia Railway, and to continue and revive the Powers granted by "The Killarney and Valencia Railway Act, 1847," (Note: Killarney and Valencia Railway Act 1847 (10 & 11 Vict. c. lxiii)) for the compulsory Purchase of Lands, and to extend the Period by such Act limited for the Completion of the said Railway.
| Great Northern Railway Act (No. 1) 1851 or the Great Northern Railway (No. 1) Act 1851 | 14 & 15 Vict. c. xlv | 3 July 1851 |
An Act to enable the Great Northern Railway Company to construct Stations at Knottingley and Wakefield; to increase their Capital; to enlarge their London Station; to amend their Acts; and for other Purposes.
| Sheffield, Rotherham, Barnsley, Wakefield, Huddersfield and Goole Railway Deviation and Amendment Act 1851 | 14 & 15 Vict. c. xlvi | 3 July 1851 |
An Act to authorise Deviations of the Sheffield, Rotherham, Barnsley, Wakefield, Huddersfield, and Goole Railway between Sheffield and Barnsley; and to amend the Acts relating to the said Railway.
| Leeds Northern Railway Act 1851 | 14 & 15 Vict. c. xlvii | 3 July 1851 |
An Act for altering the Name of the Leeds and Thirsk Railway Company to the Name of the Leeds Northern Railway Company, for extending the Time for Completion of certain Works, for regulating the Capital of the Company, and for other Purposes.
| Great Western Railway Act 1851 | 14 & 15 Vict. c. xlviii | 3 July 1851 |
An Act for enabling Arrangements with reference to the Purchase, Lease, or other Use by the Great Western Railway Company of the Wilts, Somerset, and Weymouth Railway, the Gloucester and Dean Forest Railway, and the South Wales Railway respectively, to be effected; and for other Purposes.
| Briton Ferry Dock and Railway Act 1851 | 14 & 15 Vict. c. xlix | 3 July 1851 |
An Act for making and maintaining Docks at Baglan Bay in the County of Glamorgan, with a Branch Line of Railway to the South Wales Railway.
| Stroud and Gloucester Turnpike Road Act 1851 (repealed) | 14 & 15 Vict. c. l | 3 July 1851 |
An Act for repairing the Road from the Town of Stroud in the County of Gloucester, through Pitchcomb, into the City of Gloucester. (Repealed by Statute Law (Repeals) Act 2013 (c. 2))
| Price's Patent Candle Company's Amendment Act 1851 (repealed) | 14 & 15 Vict. c. li | 3 July 1851 |
An Act for extending the Powers of Price's Patent Candle Company in relation to Letters Patent for Inventions applicable to their Undertaking. (Repealed by Price's Patent Candle Company's Act 1853 (16 & 17 Vict. c. xl))
| South Wales Railway New Works Act 1851 | 14 & 15 Vict. c. lii | 3 July 1851 |
An Act to enable the South Wales Railway Company to make a new Railway in the Forest of Dean, in lieu of the Railway already authorized, to construct new Lines at Cardiff and Britton Ferry, and to make an Alteration in the Line and Levels of their Railway; and for other Purposes.
| South Devon Railway Act 1851 | 14 & 15 Vict. c. liii | 3 July 1851 |
An Act for facilitating the Conversion by the South Devon Rail way Company of Loan into Capital, and for enabling the same Company to effect Arrangements between different Classes of Shareholders for the Creation of new Shares; and for other Purposes.
| St. Andrews Railway Act 1851 | 14 & 15 Vict. c. liv | 3 July 1851 |
An Act for making a Railway from the Edinburgh, Perth, and Dundee Railway at or near to Milton in the Parish of Leuchars to the City of St Andrews, to be called "The St Andrews Railway."
| Edinburgh, Perth and Dundee Railway (Consolidation) Act 1851 | 14 & 15 Vict. c. lv | 3 July 1851 |
An Act to consolidate and amend the Acts relating to the Edinburgh, Perth, and Dundee Railway Company, and to grant further Powers to the said Company.
| East Lancashire Railway Act 1851 | 14 & 15 Vict. c. lvi | 3 July 1851 |
An Act to amend the Acts relating to the East Lancashire Railway Company, and to enable the Company to increase their Capital and Tolls.
| Midland Railway (Capital) Act 1851 | 14 & 15 Vict. c. lvii | 3 July 1851 |
An Act to regulate and increase the Capital of the Midland Railway Company, and to confirm and legalize the Creation and Issue of certain Fifty Pound Shares, and the Application of the Proceeds of such Shares; and for other Purposes.
| Eastern Union Railway Amendment Act 1851 (repealed) | 14 & 15 Vict. c. lviii | 3 July 1851 |
An Act to facilitate Intercourse between the Eastern Union and certain other Railways; to alter certain Charges upon the Eastern Union Railway and the Stowmarket Navigation; and for other Purposes. (Repealed by Great Eastern Railway Act 1862 (25 & 26 Vict. c. ccxxiii))
| Huddersfield and New Hey Turnpike Road Act 1851 | 14 & 15 Vict. c. lix | 3 July 1851 |
An Act to amend an Act passed in the Sixth Year of the Reign of King George the Fourth, intituled "An Act for repairing and maintaining the Road from Huddersfield in the West Riding of the County of York to New Hey in the Parish of Rochdale in the County of Lancaster, with a Branch to Toothill Lane in the said Riding, and for making a new Road from Buckstones to the Highway leading from Ripponden to Stainland at or near to Barkisland School," (Note: Road from Huddersfield to Rochdale Act 1825 (6 Geo. 4. c. cii)) and to continue the Term thereby granted
| Uttoxeter and Stoke near Stone, Millwich and Sandon Turnpike Roads Act 1851 | 14 & 15 Vict. c. lx | 3 July 1851 |
An Act for managing and repairing the Roads leading from Uttoxeter to Stoke near Stone, and from Millwich to Sandon in the County of Stafford.
| Brackley Turnpike Roads Consolidation Act 1851 | 14 & 15 Vict. c. lxi | 3 July 1851 |
An Act to extend the Term and alter the Provisions of Two Acts (Note: Buckingham to Banbury Road Act 1791 (31 Geo. 3. c. 133)) (Note: Road from Buckingham to Daventry Turnpike Road Act 1810 (50 Geo. 3. c. cxxxiii)) relating to the Buckingham, Brackley, and Banbury Turnpike Road, and of an Act (Note: Towcester to Weston Gate Road Act 1820 (1 Geo. 4. c. lxxiii)) relating to the Towcester, Brackley, and Weston on the Green Turnpike Road, and to consolidate the Management of the said Turnpike Roads.
| Monkland Railways (Slamannan and Borrowstouness Deviation) Act 1851 | 14 & 15 Vict. c. lxii | 3 July 1851 |
An Act to authorize certain Deviations of the Slamannan and Borrowstouness Railway.
| Dundee and Arbroath Railway (Dundee Station) Act 1851 | 14 & 15 Vict. c. lxiii | 3 July 1851 |
An Act to enable the Dundee and Arbroath Railway Company to enlarge their present Terminal Station in Dundee, and to amend the Acts relating to the Company.
| Liverpool Dock Act 1851 (repealed) | 14 & 15 Vict. c. lxiv | 3 July 1851 |
An Act to alter the Constitution of the Committee for the Affairs of the Estate of the Trustees of the Liverpool Docks, to authorize the Establishment of an Emigrants Home, and to alter and amend the Acts relating to the Docks and Harbour of Liverpool. (Repealed by Mersey Dock Acts Consolidation Act 1858 (21 & 22 Vict. c. xcii))
| Weston-super-Mare Improvement and Market Act 1851 | 14 & 15 Vict. c. lxv | 3 July 1851 |
An Act for extending the Provisions of the Weston-super-Mare Improvement and Market Act, (Note: Weston-super-Mare Improvement and Market Act 1842 (5 & 6 Vict. c. xx)) and for granting further Powers relating to the Sewage of the Town.
| Waveney Valley Railway Act 1851 (repealed) | 14 & 15 Vict. c. lxvi | 3 July 1851 |
An Act for constructing a Railway from the Tivetshall Station of the Eastern Union Railway to Bungay in Suffolk. (Repealed by Great Eastern Railway (Additional Powers) Act 1863 (26 & 27 Vict. c. cxc))
| Borough of Sunderland Act 1851 (repealed) | 14 & 15 Vict. c. lxvii | 3 July 1851 |
An Act for the better Improvement and Regulation of the Borough of Sunderland in the County of Durham, and for other Purposes. (Repealed by Tyne and Wear Act 1980 (c. xliii))
| Hayling Bridge and Causeway (Railway to Havant) Act 1851 | 14 & 15 Vict. c. lxviii | 3 July 1851 |
An Act to enable the Company of Proprietors of the Hayling Bridge and Causeway to construct a Railway from their Docks and Wharves at Langstone to join the London, Brighton, and South Coast Railway at Havant in the County of Southampton.
| Great Central Gas Consumers Act 1851 | 14 & 15 Vict. c. lxix | 3 July 1851 |
An Act to incorporate the Great Central Gas Consumers Company.
| Reading Waterworks Act 1851 (repealed) | 14 & 15 Vict. c. lxx | 3 July 1851 |
An Act to alter and enlarge the Powers of the Reading Waterworks Company, and to authorize an Extension of the Works of the said Company. (Repealed by Reading and Berkshire Water, &c. Act 1959 (7 & 8 Eliz. 2. c. xxxiii))
| Warrington and Altrincham Junction Railway Act 1851 | 14 & 15 Vict. c. lxxi | 3 July 1851 |
An Act for making a Railway from Warrington to Altrincham, with a Branch to join the Birkenhead, Lancashire, and Cheshire Junction Railway at Lower Walton, to be called the Warrington and Altrincham Junction Railway; and for other Purposes.
| Maryport and Carlisle Railway Deviation Act 1851 (repealed) | 14 & 15 Vict. c. lxxii | 3 July 1851 |
An Act for enabling the Maryport and Carlisle Railway Company, to make a Deviation in their Line of Railway, and increase their Capital; and for other Purposes. (Repealed by Maryport and Carlisle Railway Act 1855 (18 & 19 Vict. c. lxxix))
| North Shields Quay Act 1851 | 14 & 15 Vict. c. lxxiii | 3 July 1851 |
An Act for constructing find maintaining a Quay and other Works at North Shields in the County of Northumberland, and for other Purposes.
| South Wales Railway Capital Act 1851 (repealed) | 14 & 15 Vict. c. lxxiv | 3 July 1851 |
An Act to ratify and confirm certain Subscriptions and Payments made by or on behalf of the South Wales Railway Company to other Railway Companies. (Repealed by South Wales Railway Consolidation Act 1855 (18 & 19 Vict. c. xcviii))
| Great North of Scotland Railway Amendment Act 1851 (repealed) | 14 & 15 Vict. c. lxxv | 3 July 1851 |
An Act to amend the Act (Note: Great North of Scotland Railway Act 1846 (9 & 10 Vict. c. ciii)) relating to the Great North of Scotland Railway Company. (Repealed by Great North of Scotland Railway Consolidation Act 1859 (22 & 23 Vict. c. viii))
| Malmesbury Turnpike Roads Act 1851 | 14 & 15 Vict. c. lxxvi | 24 July 1851 |
An Act to renew the Term and continue the Powers and Provisions of an Act passed in the First Year of the Reign of His Majesty King George the Fourth, intituled "An Act for more effectually repairing and improving several Districts of Malmesbury Turnpike Roads, and other Roads connected therewith in the Counties of Wilts, Berks, and Gloucester," (Note: Malmesbury Turnpike Roads Act 1820 (1 Geo. 4. c. xxxii)) so far as relates to the First and Second Districts.
| Chorley Waterworks Act 1851 (repealed) | 14 & 15 Vict. c. lxxvii | 24 July 1851 |
An Act to authorize the Chorley Waterworks Company to raise a further Sum of Money. (Repealed by Liverpool Corporation Act 1921 (11 & 12 Geo. 5. c. lxxiv))
| Free Church Ministers' Widows' and Orphans' Fund Act 1851 (repealed) | 14 & 15 Vict. c. lxxviii | 24 July 1851 |
An Act for the better raising and securing a Fund for a Provision for the Widows and Children of the Ministers of the Free Church, and for the Widows and Children of the Professors holding Professors Offices in any College connected with the said Church. (Repealed by Churches and Universities (Scotland) Widows' and Orphans' Fund Order Confirmation Act 1930 (20 & 21 Geo. 5. c. cxxxiv))
| Manchester Corporation Waterworks Second Amendment Act 1851 (repealed) | 14 & 15 Vict. c. lxxix | 24 July 1851 |
An Act for the further Amendment of the Acts relating to the Manchester Corporation Waterworks. (Repealed by Manchester Corporation Waterworks Act 1854 (17 & 18 Vict. c. xxxviii))
| Great Southern and Western Railway (Ireland) Act 1851 | 14 & 15 Vict. c. lxxx | 24 July 1851 |
An Act to explain, amend, and enlarge some of the Provisions of the Acts relating to the Great Southern and Western Railway Company; and to enable the said Company to raise further Capital, and to construct a Dock or Basin at Cork.
| Great Western Railway, Birmingham Station, Act 1851 or the Great Western Railway (Birmingham Station) Act 1851 | 14 & 15 Vict. c. lxxxi | 24 July 1851 |
An Act for enabling the Great Western Railway Company to construct a Station and Works at Aston-Juxta-Birmingham.
| St. Patrick's Cathedral, Dublin, Economy Fund Act 1851 | 14 & 15 Vict. c. lxxxii | 24 July 1851 |
An Act to provide for the Repair and Maintenance of the Cathedral Church of Saint Patrick, Dublin.
| North Devon Railway and Dock Act 1851 | 14 & 15 Vict. c. lxxxiii | 24 July 1851 |
An Act for authorizing certain Deviations in the Taw Vale Extension Railway, and for other Purposes.
| York, Newcastle and Berwick Railway (Auckland Branch) Act 1851 | 14 & 15 Vict. c. lxxxiv | 24 July 1851 |
An Act for enabling the York, Newcastle, and Berwick Railway Company to abandon a Portion of their Bishop Auckland Branch Railway, and substitute in lieu thereof a new Line of Railway; and to extend the Time for the Purchase of Lands and Completion of Works on certain Lines of Railway authorized to be made in the County of Durham; and for other Purposes.
| York, Newcastle and Berwick Railway (West Durham) Act 1851 | 14 & 15 Vict. c. lxxxv | 24 July 1851 |
An Act for facilitating the Transmission to and from the York, Newcastle, and Berwick Railway of the Traffic of the Byers Green Branch of the Clarence Railway; for enabling the York, Newcastle, and Berwick Railway Company to hold Shares in the West Durham Railway; for granting further Powers to their Lessors, the Great North of England, Clarence and Hartlepool Junction, Railway Company, and the Hartlepool Dock and Railway Company, in reference to their Capital; and for other Purposes.
| Electric Telegraph Company's Amendment Act 1851 (repealed) | 14 & 15 Vict. c. lxxxvi | 24 July 1851 |
An Act for amending the Act (Note: Electric Telegraph Company's Act 1846 (9 & 10 Vict. c. xliv) relating to the Electric Telegraph Company. (Repealed by Electric Telegraph Company's Act 1853 (16 & 17 Vict. c. cciii))
| Dee Standard Restoration Act 1851 | 14 & 15 Vict. c. lxxxvii | 24 July 1851 |
An Act for the Restoration of the Standard in the River Dee, and for granting further Powers to the River Dee Company.
| Midland Railway (Leeds and Bradford Railway) Act 1851 | 14 & 15 Vict. c. lxxxviii | 24 July 1851 |
An Act to authorize the Acquisition by the Midland Railway Company of the Estate and Interest of the Leeds and Bradford Railway Company in the Leeds and Bradford Railway, and to empower the Midland Railway Company to raise Money for such Purpose.
| Blackburn Railway Act 1851 | 14 & 15 Vict. c. lxxxix | 24 July 1851 |
An Act for extending and enlarging the Powers of the Bolton, Blackburn, Clitheroe, and West Yorkshire Railway Company, for changing the Name of the Company, and for other Purposes.
| Stockton, Middlesbrough, and Yarm Waterworks Act 1851 (repealed) | 14 & 15 Vict. c. xc | 24 July 1851 |
An Act for supplying with Water the Town of Stockton in the County of Durham, and the Suburbs thereof, and the Towns of Middlesbrough and Yarm in the North Riding of the County of York, and the Suburbs thereof respectively; and for other Purposes. (Repealed by Stockton and Middlesbrough Waterworks Act 1858 (21 & 22 Vict. c. cxxxiii))
| City of London Sewers Act 1851 | 14 & 15 Vict. c. xci | 24 July 1851 |
An Act to continue "The City of London Sewers Act, 1848," (Note: City of London Sewers Act 1848 (11 & 12 Vict. c. clxiii)) and to alter and amend the Provisions of the said Act.
| River Cam Navigation Act 1851 | 14 & 15 Vict. c. xcii | 24 July 1851 |
An Act for repealing and amending the Provisions of the Acts relating to the Navigation of the River Cam or Cham, alias Grant, between Clayhithe Ferry and the King's Mill in the Town of Cambridge; for altering the Navigation Tolls; for enabling the Conservators of the said River to sue and be sued in the Name of their Clerk; for conferring additional Powers; and other Purposes.
| Birmingham Improvement Act 1851 (repealed) | 14 & 15 Vict. c. xciii | 24 July 1851 |
An Act for transferring to the Mayor, Aldermen, and Burgesses of the Borough of Birmingham in the County of Warwick the Estates, Properties, and Effects now vested in certain Commissioners having Jurisdiction over Parts of the Borough; and to provide for the better draining, lighting, paving, supplying with Water, and otherwise improving the said Borough, and making Provision for the good Government, Regulation, and Management thereof. (Repealed by Birmingham Corporation (Consolidation) Act 1883 (46 & 47 Vict. c. lxx))
| South Staffordshire Railway Act 1851 | 14 & 15 Vict. c. xciv | 24 July 1851 |
An Act for enabling the South Staffordshire Railway Company to make a certain Branch Railway, for authorizing Arrangements with the London and North-western Railway Company, and for other Purposes.
| Cork and Waterford Railway Amendment Act 1851 | 14 & 15 Vict. c. xcv | 24 July 1851 |
An Act to enable the Cork and Waterford Railway Company to make Arrangements as to their Capital, and to provide for the immediate Completion of the Tramore Branch.
| Malvern Improvement Act 1851 | 14 & 15 Vict. c. xcvi | 24 July 1851 |
An Act for the Improvement of the Town of Great Malvern in the County of Worcester, and for supplying the same with Water.
| Newark-upon-Trent Improvement Act 1851 (repealed) | 14 & 15 Vict. c. xcvii | 24 July 1851 |
An Act for better paving, lighting, draining, cleansing, and otherwise regulating and improving a Portion of the Borough of Newark in the County of Nottingham; for regulating the Butchers Market therein; and for authorizing the Commissioners of the Newark Branch of the River Trent Navigation to contribute out of their Funds a Sum of Money for the Aforesaid Purposes. (Repealed by Nottinghamshire County Council Act 1985 (c. xv))
| Brighton Extramural Cemetery Company's Act 1851 | 14 & 15 Vict. c. xcviii | 24 July 1851 |
An Act for the Consecration of a Portion of the Brighton Extramural Cemetery.
| Caledonian Railways (Lesmahagow Branches) Act 1851 | 14 & 15 Vict. c. xcix | 24 July 1851 |
An Act to enable the Caledonian Railway Company to provide for the Construction of certain Branch Railways in the County of Lanark.
| North and South Western Junction Railway Act 1851 (repealed) | 14 & 15 Vict. c. c | 24 July 1851 |
An Act for making a Railway from the Loop Line of the Windsor, Staines, and South-western (Richmond to Windsor) Railway, in the Parish of Ealing in the County of Middlesex to the London and North-western Railway in the Parish of Hammersmith in the said County, with a Branch, to be called "The North and South Western Junction Railway." (Repealed by North and South Western Junction Railway Act 1853 (16 & 17 Vict. c. lxix))
| East Anglian Railways Act 1851 (repealed) | 14 & 15 Vict. c. ci | 24 July 1851 |
An Act for amending the Acts relating to the East Anglian Railways. (Repealed by Great Eastern Railway Act 1862 (25 & 26 Vict. c. ccxxiii))
| Ulverstone and Lancaster Railway Act 1851 | 14 & 15 Vict. c. cii | 24 July 1851 |
An Act for making a Railway from the Furness Railway at Ulverstone to the Lancaster and Carlisle Railway at Carnforth, to be called "The Ulverstone and Lancaster Railway."
| Killarney Junction Railway Act 1851 | 14 & 15 Vict. c. ciii | 24 July 1851 |
An Act to amend "The Killarney Junction Railway Act, 1846." (Note: Killarney Junction Railway Act 1846 (9 & 10 Vict. c. cc))
| City of Bath Act 1851 | 14 & 15 Vict. c. civ | 24 July 1851 |
An Act for the Improvement of the City and Borough of Bath; for the Regulation of the Markets; and for amending the Act (Note: Bath Water Supply Act 1846 (9 & 10 Vict. c. ccxx)) for supplying Bath with Water.
| Governor and Company of Copper Miners Act 1851 | 14 & 15 Vict. c. cv | 24 July 1851 |
An Act for facilitating the Settlement of the Affairs of the Governor and Company of Copper Miners in England, and for the better Management of the said Company.
| Royal Edinburgh Asylum for the Insane Act 1851 | 14 & 15 Vict. c. cvi | 24 July 1851 |
An Act for of new incorporating the Edinburgh Lunatic Asylum under its present Name of "The Royal Edinburgh Asylum for the Insane," for enabling the said Corporation to borrow Money, and for other Purposes.
| Dublin and Bray Railway Act 1851 (repealed) | 14 & 15 Vict. c. cvii | 24 July 1851 |
An Act to enable the Dublin, Dundrum, and Rathfarnham Railway Company to extend their Railway from Dundrum to Bray; and to extend the Time and to continue and revive the Powers granted by the Acts relating to the Dublin, Dundrum, and Rathfarnham Railway Company for the compulsory Purchase of Lands and Completion of Works; and to amend the Acts relating to "The Dublin, Dundrum, and Rathfarnham Railway;" for other Purposes. (Repealed by Dublin and Wicklow Railway Amendment Act 1857 (20 & 21 Vict. c. xxix))
| Dublin and Wicklow Railway Act 1851 | 14 & 15 Vict. c. cviii | 24 July 1851 |
An Act to authorize the Abandonment of a Portion of the Waterford, Wexford, Wicklow, and Dublin Railway, and the Construction of a new Line of Railway in lieu of a Portion of the line to be abandoned; to extend, in respect of a Portion of the said Undertaking, the Periods at present limited for compulsory Purchase of Lands and for Completion of Works; and to amend the Acts relating to the said Railway; and for other Purposes.
| Southampton and Itchen Floating Bridge and Road Amendment Act 1851 (repealed) | 14 & 15 Vict. c. cix | 24 July 1851 |
An Act for amending and enlarging the Powers of the several Acts relating to "The Company of Proprietors of the Itchen Bridge and Roads." (Repealed by Southampton Corporation Act 1931 (21 & 22 Geo. 5. c. xcix))
| Waterford and Limerick Railway (Deviations) Act 1851 | 14 & 15 Vict. c. cx | 24 July 1851 |
An Act to authorise a Deviation in the Line of the Waterford and Limerick Railway, and to amend the Acts relating thereto, and for other Purposes.
| East Stonehouse Waterworks Act 1851 (repealed) | 14 & 15 Vict. c. cxi | 24 July 1851 |
An Act for supplying with Water the Parish or Township of East Stonehouse in the County of Devon, and for Amendment of Act. (Note: Stonehouse Water Supply Act 1592 (35 Eliz. 1. c. 10 Pr.)) (Repealed by Plymouth Water Order 1969 (SI 1969/23))
| Waterford and Tramore Railway Act 1851 | 14 & 15 Vict. c. cxii | 24 July 1851 |
An Act for making a Railway from Waterford to Tramore.
| Midland Railway (Extension of Time) Act 1851 | 14 & 15 Vict. c. cxiii | 24 July 1851 |
An Act to extend the Time for the Purchase of certain Lands and Completion of Works authorized by the "Midland Railway, Ripley Branches, Act, 1848," (Note: Midland Railway (Ripley Branches) Act 1848 (11 & 12 Vict. c. lxxxviii)) and on the Gloucester and Stonehouse Junction Railway.
| Great Northern Railway (Communication with Manchester, Sheffield, and Lincolnshire Railway) Act 1851 | 14 & 15 Vict. c. cxiv | 24 July 1851 |
An Act to enable the Great Northern Railway Company to construct Works in connexion with the Manchester, Sheffield, and Lincolnshire Railway; and to facilitate the Use of that Railway by the Company; and for other Purposes.
| Imperial Continental Gas Association Act 1851 (repealed) | 14 & 15 Vict. c. cxv | 1 August 1851 |
An Act for amending the Powers of the Imperial Continental Gas Association. (Repealed by Imperial Continental Gas Association Act 1853 (16 & 17 Vict. c. cxc))
| Kensington Improvement Act 1851 | 14 & 15 Vict. c. cxvi | 1 August 1851 |
An Act for better paving, lighting, cleansing, regulating, and improving the Parish of Saint Mary Abbotts, Kensington.
| Hartlepool Pier and Port Act 1851 (repealed) | 14 & 15 Vict. c. cxvii | 1 August 1851 |
An Act for enabling the Commissioners of the Pier and Port of Hartlepool to construct an additional Pier for the Protection of the Harbours and Bay of Hartlepool, and to establish and maintain a Ferry across the Commissioners Harbour; for enabling the Commissioners to raise further Monies; for repealing, consolidating, and amending the Acts relating to the said Pier and Port; and for other Purposes. (Repealed by Hartlepool Port and Harbour Act 1855 (18 & 19 Vict. c. cxxvi))
| Magnetic Telegraph Company's Act 1851 | 14 & 15 Vict. c. cxviii | 1 August 1851 |
An Act for incorporating the Magnetic Telegraph Company, and to enable the said Company to Work certain Letters Patent.
| Manchester General Improvement Act 1851 | 14 & 15 Vict. c. cxix | 1 August 1851 |
An Act for paving, lighting, cleansing, and otherwise improving the several Townships and Places in the Borough of Manchester, and amending and consolidating the Provisions of existing Local Acts relating thereto.
| Clerkenwell Improvement Act 1851 | 14 & 15 Vict. c. cxx | 1 August 1851 |
An Act for enabling the Mayor and Commonalty and Citizens of the City of London to complete the Improvements authorized to be made by the Clerkenwell Improvement Commissioners, and for amending the Acts relating to such Improvements.
| Wicklow Harbour Act 1851 | 14 & 15 Vict. c. cxxi | 1 August 1851 |
An Act to amend an Act passed in the Session of Parliament of the Fifth and Sixth Years of the Reign of Her present Majesty, intituled "An Act for making and maintaining and improving a Harbour at Wicklow in the County of Wicklow." (Note: Wicklow Harbour Act 1842 (5 & 6 Vict. c. cxi))
| Warkworth Dock Act 1851 | 14 & 15 Vict. c. cxxii | 1 August 1851 |
An Act for constructing a Wet Dock and other Works in connexion with Warkworth Harbour in the County of Northumberland, and for limiting the Amount of Rates and Tolls by "The Warkworth Harbour Act, 1847," (Note: Warkworth Harbour Act 1847 (10 & 11 Vict. c. cxxviii)) authorised to be levied, and for varying the Application thereof
| Thames Haven Dock and Railway Act 1851 (repealed) | 14 & 15 Vict. c. cxxiii | 1 August 1851 |
An Act to amend and enlarge some of the Provisions of the Acts relating to the Thames Haven Dock and Railway. (Repealed by Thames Haven Dock Company's Act 1856 (19 & 20 Vict. c. cxix))
| Wexford Free Bridge Act 1851 | 14 & 15 Vict. c. cxxiv | 1 August 1851 |
An Act to amend the Wexford Free Bridge Act, 1847. (Note: Wexford Free Bridge Act 1847 (10 & 11 Vict. c. cclix))
| Llynvi Valley Railway Act 1851 (repealed) | 14 & 15 Vict. c. cxxv | 1 August 1851 |
An Act for amending the Acts relating to the Llynvi Valley and Duffryn Llynvi and Porth Cawl Railways, and for forming a Junction between such Railways and the South Wales Railway. (Repealed by Llynvi Valley Railway Act 1855 (18 & 19 Vict. c. l))
| Cromford Canal Sale Act 1851 | 14 & 15 Vict. c. cxxvi | 1 August 1851 |
An Act to enable the Manchester, Buxton, Matlock, and Midlands Junction Railway Company to complete the Purchaae of the Cromford Canal.
| Loughor Coal and Railway Company's Act 1851 | 14 & 15 Vict. c. cxxvii | 1 August 1851 |
An Act for extending the Period for the Completion of Cameron's Coalbrook Steam Coal and Swansea and Loughor Railway, and for amending the Act (Note: Cameron's Coalbrook Steam Coal and Swansea and Loughor Railway Company's Act 1846 (9 & 10 Vict. c. cccci)) relating to such Railway.
| Trinity College Dublin Leasing and Perpetuity Act 1851 | 14 & 15 Vict. c. cxxviii | 1 August 1851 |
An Act to extend the leasing Powers of the Corporate Body of the Provost, Fellows, and Scholars of the College of the Holy and Undivided Trinity of Queen Elizabeth near Dublin, and also of the Provost thereof in his Corporate Capacity, and to enable them to make Grants of Lands in perpetuity to their Lessees in certain Cases.
| Manchester and Salford Extension Railway Act 1851 | 14 & 15 Vict. c. cxxix | 1 August 1851 |
An Act for making a Railway from the London and North-western Railway in the Township of Salford, across the River Irwell, into the borough of Manchester, to be called the Manchester and Salford Extension Railway.
| General Reversionary and Investment Company's Act 1851 | 14 & 15 Vict. c. cxxx | 1 August 1851 |
An Act for better enabling the General Reversionary and Investment Company to sue and be sued, and to facilitate the holding and Transfer of the Property of the Company by and from the present and future Trustees thereof; and for other Purposes.
| Shrewsbury and Chester Railway (Birkenhead Station) Act 1851 | 14 & 15 Vict. c. cxxxi | 7 August 1851 |
An Act to authorize the Shrewsbury and Chester Railway Company to abandon the Crickheath and Wem Branches, to construct a Station at Birkenhead, to enter into Arrangements with other Companies, and for other Purposes.
| Saint Helens Improvement Act 1851 or the St. Helens Improvement Act 1851 (repealed) | 14 & 15 Vict. c. cxxxii | 7 August 1851 |
An Act for amending and extending the Provisions of the Act (Note: Saint Helens Improvement Act 1845 (8 & 9 Vict. c. clxxvi)) for the Improvement of the Town of Saint Helen's in the County Palatine of Lancaster, and for other Purposes. (Repealed by Saint Helens Improvement Act 1855 (18 & 19 Vict. c. lxxiv))
| Sheffield and Glossop Turnpike Road Act 1851 | 14 & 15 Vict. c. cxxxiii | 7 August 1851 |
An Act for repairing the Road from Sheffield in the County of York to the Marple Bridge Road in the Parish of Glossop in the County of Derby, and the Branch to Mortimer's Road in the Parish of Hathersage in the said County of Derby.
| Caledonian Railway Arrangements Act 1851 | 14 & 15 Vict. c. cxxxiv | 7 August 1851 |
An Act to sanction certain Arrangements entered into between the Caledonian Railway Company and the Holders of guaranteed and preferential Interests in the Company, and to enable the Company to raise a further Sum of Money.
| European and American Electric Printing Telegraph Company's Act 1851 | 14 & 15 Vict. c. cxxxv | 7 August 1851 |
An Act for incorporating the European and American Electric Printing Telegraph Company, and to enable them to work certain Letters Patent.
| Lincolnshire Estuary Act 1851 | 14 & 15 Vict. c. cxxxvi | 7 August 1851 |
An Act for reclaiming from the Sea certain Lands abutting on the Coast of Lincolnshire within the Parts of Holland.
| United Kingdom Electric Telegraph Company's Act 1851 | 14 & 15 Vict. c. cxxxvii | 7 August 1851 |
An Act for enabling the United Kingdom Electric Telegraph Company to purchase and work certain Letters Patent.
| King's College Hospital Act 1851 | 14 & 15 Vict. c. cxxxviii | 7 August 1851 |
An Act for incorporating the Council of King's College, London, and the President, Vice-Presidents, Treasurer, and Governors of King's College Hospital, and for connecting the said Hospital as a Medical School with the said College, and for better enabling the Corporation to carry on their charitable and useful Designs.
| National Land Company Dissolving Act 1851 | 14 & 15 Vict. c. cxxxix | 7 August 1851 |
An Act to dissolve "The National Land Company," and to dispose of the Lands and Property belonging to the Company, and to wind up the Undertaking.
| Brunswick Square Improvement Extension Act 1851 | 14 & 15 Vict. c. cxl | 7 August 1851 |
An Act to extend the Limits of the Brunswick Square (Hove) Improvement Act, (Note: Hove Improvement Act 1830 (11 Geo. 4 & 1 Will. 4. c. xvi)) and for other Purposes.
| Waterford and Kilkenny Railway Amendment Act 1851 | 14 & 15 Vict. c. cxli | 7 August 1851 |
An Act to amend the several Acts relating to the Waterford and Kilkenny Railway Company; to enable the said Company to sell or lease their Undertaking, and to purchase or lease the Bridge over the River Suir at Waterford; and for other Purposes.
| South Holland Drainage Act 1851 | 14 & 15 Vict. c. cxlii | 7 August 1851 |
An Act to enable the Trustees of the South Holland Drainage in the County of Lincoln to raise further Monies.
| Farmer's Estate Act 1851 | 14 & 15 Vict. c. cxliii | 7 August 1851 |
An Act to amend "The Farmers Estate Society (Ireland) Act, 1848." (Note: Farmers Estate Society (Ireland) Act 1848 (11 & 12 Vict. c. cliii))
| Charing Cross Bridge Act 1851 | 14 & 15 Vict. c. cxliv | 7 August 1851 |
An Act to enable the Charing Cross Bridge Company to raise further Monies; to amend the Acts relating to the Company; and for other Purposes.
| Class A Shareholders of the St. Andrews and Quebec Railroad Company's Act 1851 | 14 & 15 Vict. c. cxlv | 7 August 1851 |
An Act for enabling the Class A Shareholders of the Saint Andrew's and Quebec Railroad Company to divide the Shares in the Undertaking into Two Classes, and for other Purposes.
| Coal Duties (London and Westminster and Adjacent Counties) Act 1851 (repealed) | 14 & 15 Vict. c. cxlvi | 8 August 1851 |
An Act to amend the Acts relating to the Vend and Delivery of Coals in London and Westminster, and in certain Parts of the adjacent Counties; and to allow a Drawback on Coals conveyed beyond certain Limits. (Repealed by Statute Law (Repeals) Act 2008 (c. 12))

=== Private acts ===
| Short title | Citation | Royal assent |
Long title
| Samuel Athawes' Estate Act 1851 | 14 & 15 Vict. c. 1 Pr. | 3 July 1851 |
An Act to authorize the Sale to the Honourable Richard Cavendish of certain Freehold Hereditaments in the County of Buckingham devised by the Will of Samuel Athawes deceased, and for directing the Investment of the Purchase Money in other Hereditaments, to be settled upon the Trusts of the same Will.
| Christ's Hospital Estate Act 1851 | 14 & 15 Vict. c. 2 Pr. | 3 July 1851 |
An Act for confirming certain Leases granted by the Mayor and Commonalty and Citizens of the City of London, Governors of the Possessions, Revenues, and Goods of the Hospital of Edward, late King of England, the Sixth, called Christs Hospital; and for enabling them to grant building and other Leases of their Estates; and for other Purposes.
| St. Bartholomew's Hospital Estate Act 1851 | 14 & 15 Vict. c. 3 Pr. | 24 July 1851 |
An Act for confirming certain Leases granted by the Mayor and Commonalty and Citizens of the City of London, Governors of the House of the Poor commonly called Saini Bartholomew's Hospital, near West Smithfield, London, of the Foundation of King Henry the Eighth; and for enabling them to grant building and other Leases of their Estates.
| Thomas Cubitt's Estate Act 1851 | 14 & 15 Vict. c. 4 Pr. | 24 July 1851 |
An Act to authorize the Grant of new Leases of a certain Estate in the Bailiwick of Neat in the Parish of Saint George Hanover Square in the County of Middlesex, in Lease to Mr. Thomas Cubitt; and for other Purposes.
| Sir Thomas Lethbridge's Estate Act 1851 | 14 & 15 Vict. c. 5 Pr. | 24 July 1851 |
An Act for enabling the Trustees of the Somersetshire, Monmouthshire, Dorsetshire and Devonshire Estates devised by the Will of Sir Thomas Buckler Lethbridge Baronet, deceased, to grant Farming and Mining Leases of and otherwise extending their Powers in relation to the said Estates.
| Thomas Jackson's Estate Act 1851 | 14 & 15 Vict. c. 6 Pr. | 24 July 1851 |
An Act for enabling the Trustees of the Will of Thomas Jackson deceased to sell Freehold Hereditaments situate in the Parish of Mentmore in the County of Buckingham to the Baron Mayer Amschel de Rothschild.
| Upton's Estate Act 1851 | 14 & 15 Vict. c. 7 Pr. | 24 July 1851 |
An Act to confirm a certain Contract for granting Leases made and entered into by the Honourable Arthur Upton of Part of the Lands and Hereditaments comprised in the Will of the Honourable Fulk Greville Howard deceased, situate at Kilburn in the County of Middlesex; and to alter and enlarge the Power of granting Building Leases contained in the same Will; and for other Purposes relating thereto.
| Glasgow Provident Bank (Winding-Up) Act 1851 | 14 & 15 Vict. c. 8 Pr. | 1 August 1851 |
An Act to authorize the Appropriation to charitable Purposes of the unclaimed Funds and Property under the Control of "The Glasgow Provident Bank," and the winding up of its Affairs.
| Musselburgh Estate Act 1851 | 14 & 15 Vict. c. 9 Pr. | 1 August 1851 |
An Act for regulating and securing the Debt due by the Burgh of Musselburgh in the County of Edinburgh, and for other Purposes in relation thereto.
| William Moore's Estate Act 1851 | 14 & 15 Vict. c. 10 Pr. | 1 August 1851 |
An Act to authorise the granting of Building Leases of Part of the Estates devised by the Will of William Moore Esquire, deceived, situate in the Parish of Fulham in the County of Middlesex.
| Sir Thomas Shelley's Estate Act 1851 | 14 & 15 Vict. c. 11 Pr. | 1 August 1851 |
An Act authorising the Application of Part of the Trust Funds subject to the Trusts of the Will and Codicils of the late Sir Thomas Shelley to certain lasting Improvements upon Estates bought under the Trusts of such Will and Codicils.
| Duke of Bridgewater's Estate Act 1851 | 14 & 15 Vict. c. 12 Pr. | 7 August 1851 |
An Act to enable the Trustees of the Will of the Most Noble Francis late Duke of Bridgewater to make Conveyances in Fee or Demises for long Terms of Years of his Trust Estates, and more effectually to administer the Trusts of the Will of the said Duke.
| Barton's Estate Act 1851 | 14 & 15 Vict. c. 13 Pr. | 7 August 1851 |
An Act for extending Powers created by the Will of John Watson Barton deceased, and for enabling Sales and Leases to be made of Lands subject to his Will; and for other Purposes.
| Westminster Abbey Estate Act 1851 | 14 & 15 Vict. c. 14 Pr. | 7 August 1851 |
An Act to empower the Dean and Chapter of Westminster to build on Ground contiguous to Westminster Abbey, and for other Purposes.
| Duke of Bedford's Estate Act 1851 | 14 & 15 Vict. c. 15 Pr. | 7 August 1851 |
An Act to give effect to certain Restrictions and Conditions relating to a Church and Parsonage House proposed to be erected on Sites to be given by the Most Noble Francis Duke of Bedford, Knight of the Most Noble Order of the Garter, and to Two Dwelling Houses proposed to be purchased and conveyed for Vicarage and Rectory Houses on the Estate of the said Duke, in the County of Middlesex.
| Brown's Estate Act 1851 | 14 & 15 Vict. c. 16 Pr. | 7 August 1851 |
An Act to enable the Committees of the Estate of John Brown, a Lunatic, to sell a Portion of the Estates whereof the said Lunatic is Tenant in Tail in possession.
| Dorward's House of Refuge for the Destitute Act 1851 | 14 & 15 Vict. c. 17 Pr. | 7 August 1851 |
An Act for explaining and modifying the Provisions of the Deed of Constitution o£ Dorward's House of Refuge for the Destitute in Montrose, and of the Trust Disposition and Settlement of William Dorward Merchant in Montrose, and Codicils thereto, and for incorporating and enlarging and defining the Powers of the Managers of the said House of Refuge, and for other Purposes relating thereto.
| Christ Church (Oxford) Estate Act 1851 | 14 & 15 Vict. c. 18 Pr. | 7 August 1851 |
An Act to enable the Dean and Chapter of the Cathedral Church of Christ in Oxford, of the Foundation of King Henry the Eighth, and their Trustees, as Owners in Fee of Lands in Kentish Town in the County of Middlesex, to grant Building Leases, and for other Purposes.
| Stapylton Stapylton's Estate Act 1851 | 14 & 15 Vict. c. 19 Pr. | 7 August 1851 |
An Act for enabling the Committee or Committees for the Time being of the Estate of Stapylton Stapylton Esquire, a Lunatic, Tenant in Tail Male under the Will of the Reverend Sir Martin Stapylton Baronet, deceased, to grant Leases for Mining and other Purposes of certain Parts of the entailed Estates situate at Eston in the County of York.
| Felstead's Charities Act 1851 | 14 & 15 Vict. c. 20 Pr. | 7 August 1851 |
An Act for the Regulation and Improvement of the Charities founded by Richard Lord Riche in the Parish of Felstead in the County of Essex, and for other Purposes.
| Lord Bateman's Kelmarsh Estate Act 1851 | 14 & 15 Vict. c. 21 Pr. | 7 August 1851 |
An Act for authorizing the Sale of the Kelmarsh Estate in the County of Northampton, devised by the Will of William Lord Bateman deceased, and the Discharge of the Incumbrances affecting that Estate; and for other Purposes.
| Brentwood School and Charity Act 1851 | 14 & 15 Vict. c. 22 Pr. | 7 August 1851 |
An Act to provide for the future Regulation and Management of the Grammar School o£ Anthony Browne, Serjeant-at-Law, at Brentwood in the County of Essex, and of the Almshouses founded by the said Anthony Browne, and of the Estates and Possessions of the same School and Almshouses; and for other Purposes.
| Ripley Free School Estate Act 1851 | 14 & 15 Vict. c. 23 Pr. | 8 August 1851 |
An Act to authorize the Sale or Exchange of Part of the Estate of the Free School at Ripley in the County of York, and for other Purposes relating to the said Charity.
| Heathcote's Divorce Act 1851 (Note: This act was not printed by the Queen's Printer.) | 14 & 15 Vict. c. 24 Pr. | 20 May 1851 |
An Act to dissolve the Marriage of Edmund Heathcote Esquire with Elizabeth Lucy Heathcote his now Wife, and to enable him to marry again; and for other Purposes.
| Webster's Divorce Act 1851 | 14 & 15 Vict. c. 25 Pr. | 7 August 1851 |
An Act to dissolve the Marriage of Henry Boddingion Webster Esquire with Emilie Marie Louise Wilhelmina Webster his now Wife, and to enable him to marry again; and for other Purposes.
| Tayleur's Divorce Act 1851 | 14 & 15 Vict. c. 26 Pr. | 7 August 1851 |
An Act to dissolve the Marriage of William Houlbrooke Tayleur Esquire with Emma Elizabeth Tayleur his now Wife, and to enable him to marry again; and for other Purposes.

=== Sources ===
- The Statutes of the United Kingdom of Great Britain and Ireland, 14 & 15 Victoria. 1851. London: Her Majesty's Printers. 1851 – via Google Books.
- The Statutes of the United Kingdom of Great Britain and Ireland, 14 & 15 Victoria. 1851. 1851 – via Internet Archive.

== See also ==
- List of acts of the Parliament of the United Kingdom
