= Leases for Mills (Ireland) Act 1851 =

Act of the Parliament of the United Kingdom

Leases for Mills (Ireland) Act 1851 (Note: The citation of this act by this short title was authorised by section 1 of, and the first schedule to, the Short Titles Act 1896. Due to the repeal of those provisions it is now authorised by section 19(2) of the Interpretation Act 1978.)
- Act of Parliament
- Parliament of the United Kingdom
- Long title: An Act to amend an Act of Parliament of Ireland of the Twenty-fifth Year of King George the Third, for explaining and amending several Laws for the Encouragement of Agriculture, so far as relates to Leases for the Erection of Mills.
- Citation: 14 & 15 Vict. c. 7
- Territorial extent: Ireland (Note: Section 1.)

Dates
- Royal assent: 11 April 1851
- Commencement: 11 April 1851 (Note: The Acts of Parliament (Commencement) Act 1793.)
- Repealed: Northern Ireland: 17 February 1953; Republic of Ireland: 21 July 2009
Other legislation
Amends	Leases for Corn Mills Act 1785
Repealed by	Northern Ireland: Repeal of Unnecessary Laws Act (Northern Ireland) 1953; Republic of Ireland: Land and Conveyancing Law Reform Act 2009
Relates to	Exportation Act 1785

Status: Repealed

Text of statute as originally enacted

The Leases for Mills (Ireland) Act 1851 (14 & 15 Vict. c. 7) was an act of the Parliament of the United Kingdom. The act extended the powers of various members of the clergy and landowners to authorise and lease their land to build watermills to Ireland, which was previously omitted. The act received royal assent on 11 April 1851.

== Provisions ==
The provisions of the act include:

- Extending the powers conferred in the Exportation Act 1785 (25 Geo. 3. c. 62) to Ireland.
  - Powers were given to bishops and members of the clergy, governors and fellows of hospitals or colleges, and anyone "in possession in Law or Equity of an Estate in Fee Tail or ... in trust" to lease their land to others for the building of mills or associated infrastructure.

== Repeal ==
All parts of the act still in effect were repealed by the Land and Conveyancing Law Reform Act 2009 of the Irish Parliament.
