= Glebe (Ireland) Act 1851 =

Act of the Parliament of the United Kingdom

- Act of Parliament
- Parliament of the United Kingdom
- Long title: An Act to consolidate and amend the Laws relating to Ecclesiastical Residences in Ireland.
- Citation: 14 & 15 Vict. c. 73
- Territorial extent: Ireland (Note: Preamble.)

Dates
- Royal assent: 7 August 1851
- Commencement: 7 August 1851 (Note: The Acts of Parliament (Commencement) Act 1793.)

Status: Amended

Text of statute as originally enacted

The Glebe (Ireland) Act 1851 (14 & 15 Vict. c. 73) is an act of the Parliament of the United Kingdom that consolidated enactments related to ecclesiastical residences in Ireland.
