= Irish Poor Law Extension Act 1847 =

Act of the Parliament of the United Kingdom

Poor Relief (Ireland) Act 1847 (Note: The citation of this act by this short title was authorised by section 1 of, and the first schedule to, the Short Titles Act 1896. Due to the repeal of those provisions it is now authorised by section 19(2) of the Interpretation Act 1978.)
- Act of Parliament
- Parliament of the United Kingdom
- Long title: An Act to make further Provision for the Relief of the destitute Poor in Ireland.
- Citation: 10 & 11 Vict. c. 31
- Territorial extent: Ireland (Note: Section 30.)

Dates
- Royal assent: 8 June 1847
- Commencement: 8 June 1847 (Note: The Acts of Parliament (Commencement) Act 1793.)
- Repealed: 1 October 1973 (Note: The Local Government (Postponement of Elections and Reorganisation) (Northern Ireland) Order 1972 (SI 1972/1998 (N.I. 2)1).)
Other legislation
Amended by	Statute Law Revision Act 1875
Repealed by	Statute Law Revision Act (Northern Ireland) 1954; Health and Personal Social Services (Northern Ireland) Order 1972

Status: Repealed

Text of statute as originally enacted

Poor Relief (Ireland) (No. 1) Act 1847
- Act of Parliament
- Parliament of the United Kingdom
- Long title: An Act to render valid certain Proceedings for the Relief of Distress in Ireland, by Employment of the labouring Poor, and to indemnify those who have acted in such Proceedings.
- Citation: 10 & 11 Vict. c. 10
- Territorial extent: United Kingdom

Dates
- Royal assent: 18 March 1847
- Commencement: 18 March 1847 (Note: Section 1.)
- Repealed: 11 August 1875
Other legislation
Repealed by	Statute Law Revision Act 1875

Status: Repealed

Text of statute as originally enacted

Poor Relief (Ireland) (No. 2) Act 1847
- Act of Parliament
- Parliament of the United Kingdom
- Long title: An Act to provide for the Execution of the Laws for Relief of the Poor in Ireland.
- Citation: 10 & 11 Vict. c. 90
- Territorial extent: United Kingdom

Dates
- Royal assent: 22 July 1847
- Commencement: 22 July 1847 (Note: The Acts of Parliament (Commencement) Act 1793.)
Other legislation
Amended by	Statute Law Revision Act 1875

Status: Amended

Text of statute as originally enacted

Poor Relief (Ireland) (No. 3) Act 1847
- Act of Parliament
- Parliament of the United Kingdom
- Long title: An Act to authorize a further Advance of Money for the Relief of destitute Persons in Ireland.
- Citation: 10 & 11 Vict. c. 55
- Territorial extent: United Kingdom

Dates
- Royal assent: 25 June 1847
- Commencement: 25 June 1847
- Repealed: 11 August 1875
Other legislation
Repealed by	Statute Law Revision Act 1875

Status: Repealed

Text of statute as originally enacted

The Poor Relief (Ireland) Act 1847 (10 & 11 Vict. c. 31), also known as the Irish Poor Law Extension Act 1847 or the Poor Law Amendment Act 1847, was an act of the Parliament of the United Kingdom which altered the Irish Poor Law system. The passing of the act meant that the full cost of the Irish Poor Law system fell upon Irish property owners.

== See also ==
- Irish Poor Law

== Bibliography ==
- Kinealy, Christine (2006) [1994]. This Great Calamity. The Great Irish Famine, 1845-52. Dublin: Gill and Macmillan.
